

309001–309100 

|-bgcolor=#E9E9E9
| 309001 ||  || — || October 17, 2006 || Kitt Peak || Spacewatch || WIT || align=right | 1.1 km || 
|-id=002 bgcolor=#d6d6d6
| 309002 ||  || — || October 17, 2006 || Kitt Peak || Spacewatch || BRA || align=right | 1.2 km || 
|-id=003 bgcolor=#E9E9E9
| 309003 ||  || — || October 17, 2006 || Mount Lemmon || Mount Lemmon Survey || HEN || align=right | 1.2 km || 
|-id=004 bgcolor=#d6d6d6
| 309004 ||  || — || October 18, 2006 || Kitt Peak || Spacewatch || KOR || align=right | 1.1 km || 
|-id=005 bgcolor=#E9E9E9
| 309005 ||  || — || October 17, 2006 || Kitt Peak || Spacewatch || NEM || align=right | 2.1 km || 
|-id=006 bgcolor=#d6d6d6
| 309006 ||  || — || October 17, 2006 || Kitt Peak || Spacewatch || — || align=right | 2.7 km || 
|-id=007 bgcolor=#E9E9E9
| 309007 ||  || — || October 17, 2006 || Kitt Peak || Spacewatch || HOF || align=right | 3.0 km || 
|-id=008 bgcolor=#d6d6d6
| 309008 ||  || — || October 17, 2006 || Kitt Peak || Spacewatch || EOS || align=right | 2.7 km || 
|-id=009 bgcolor=#d6d6d6
| 309009 ||  || — || October 17, 2006 || Mount Lemmon || Mount Lemmon Survey || KOR || align=right | 1.8 km || 
|-id=010 bgcolor=#d6d6d6
| 309010 ||  || — || October 17, 2006 || Kitt Peak || Spacewatch || — || align=right | 3.7 km || 
|-id=011 bgcolor=#d6d6d6
| 309011 ||  || — || October 17, 2006 || Mount Lemmon || Mount Lemmon Survey || KOR || align=right | 1.3 km || 
|-id=012 bgcolor=#d6d6d6
| 309012 ||  || — || October 17, 2006 || Mount Lemmon || Mount Lemmon Survey || KOR || align=right | 1.8 km || 
|-id=013 bgcolor=#d6d6d6
| 309013 ||  || — || October 17, 2006 || Kitt Peak || Spacewatch || KOR || align=right | 1.3 km || 
|-id=014 bgcolor=#E9E9E9
| 309014 ||  || — || October 17, 2006 || Kitt Peak || Spacewatch || — || align=right | 1.0 km || 
|-id=015 bgcolor=#d6d6d6
| 309015 ||  || — || October 18, 2006 || Kitt Peak || Spacewatch || KOR || align=right | 1.6 km || 
|-id=016 bgcolor=#d6d6d6
| 309016 ||  || — || October 18, 2006 || Kitt Peak || Spacewatch || — || align=right | 2.7 km || 
|-id=017 bgcolor=#E9E9E9
| 309017 ||  || — || October 19, 2006 || Kitt Peak || Spacewatch || HNA || align=right | 2.3 km || 
|-id=018 bgcolor=#E9E9E9
| 309018 ||  || — || October 19, 2006 || Kitt Peak || Spacewatch || AGN || align=right | 1.1 km || 
|-id=019 bgcolor=#E9E9E9
| 309019 ||  || — || October 19, 2006 || Kitt Peak || Spacewatch || — || align=right | 2.6 km || 
|-id=020 bgcolor=#E9E9E9
| 309020 ||  || — || October 19, 2006 || Kitt Peak || Spacewatch || AST || align=right | 1.7 km || 
|-id=021 bgcolor=#d6d6d6
| 309021 ||  || — || October 19, 2006 || Kitt Peak || Spacewatch || KOR || align=right | 1.3 km || 
|-id=022 bgcolor=#E9E9E9
| 309022 ||  || — || October 19, 2006 || Mount Lemmon || Mount Lemmon Survey || — || align=right | 2.0 km || 
|-id=023 bgcolor=#d6d6d6
| 309023 ||  || — || October 19, 2006 || Kitt Peak || Spacewatch || — || align=right | 2.2 km || 
|-id=024 bgcolor=#d6d6d6
| 309024 ||  || — || October 19, 2006 || Kitt Peak || Spacewatch || KOR || align=right | 1.1 km || 
|-id=025 bgcolor=#d6d6d6
| 309025 ||  || — || September 25, 2006 || Mount Lemmon || Mount Lemmon Survey || — || align=right | 2.4 km || 
|-id=026 bgcolor=#d6d6d6
| 309026 ||  || — || October 19, 2006 || Kitt Peak || Spacewatch || CHA || align=right | 1.8 km || 
|-id=027 bgcolor=#d6d6d6
| 309027 ||  || — || October 19, 2006 || Kitt Peak || Spacewatch || EOS || align=right | 2.1 km || 
|-id=028 bgcolor=#E9E9E9
| 309028 ||  || — || October 20, 2006 || Mount Lemmon || Mount Lemmon Survey || — || align=right | 2.0 km || 
|-id=029 bgcolor=#E9E9E9
| 309029 ||  || — || October 21, 2006 || Mount Lemmon || Mount Lemmon Survey || WIT || align=right | 1.2 km || 
|-id=030 bgcolor=#E9E9E9
| 309030 ||  || — || October 21, 2006 || Mount Lemmon || Mount Lemmon Survey || HOF || align=right | 2.8 km || 
|-id=031 bgcolor=#d6d6d6
| 309031 ||  || — || October 21, 2006 || Mount Lemmon || Mount Lemmon Survey || KOR || align=right | 1.9 km || 
|-id=032 bgcolor=#E9E9E9
| 309032 ||  || — || October 22, 2006 || Kitt Peak || Spacewatch || — || align=right | 1.0 km || 
|-id=033 bgcolor=#E9E9E9
| 309033 ||  || — || October 16, 2006 || Catalina || CSS || — || align=right | 3.3 km || 
|-id=034 bgcolor=#E9E9E9
| 309034 ||  || — || October 16, 2006 || Catalina || CSS || GEF || align=right | 1.5 km || 
|-id=035 bgcolor=#E9E9E9
| 309035 ||  || — || October 19, 2006 || Catalina || CSS || — || align=right | 2.9 km || 
|-id=036 bgcolor=#E9E9E9
| 309036 ||  || — || October 19, 2006 || Catalina || CSS || — || align=right | 2.9 km || 
|-id=037 bgcolor=#d6d6d6
| 309037 ||  || — || October 20, 2006 || Kitt Peak || Spacewatch || — || align=right | 2.5 km || 
|-id=038 bgcolor=#d6d6d6
| 309038 ||  || — || October 20, 2006 || Kitt Peak || Spacewatch || KOR || align=right | 1.3 km || 
|-id=039 bgcolor=#E9E9E9
| 309039 ||  || — || October 29, 2006 || Kitami || K. Endate || — || align=right | 1.5 km || 
|-id=040 bgcolor=#E9E9E9
| 309040 ||  || — || October 30, 2006 || Nyukasa || Mount Nyukasa Stn. || — || align=right | 1.1 km || 
|-id=041 bgcolor=#E9E9E9
| 309041 ||  || — || October 17, 2006 || Kitt Peak || Spacewatch || — || align=right | 2.7 km || 
|-id=042 bgcolor=#d6d6d6
| 309042 ||  || — || October 22, 2006 || Mount Lemmon || Mount Lemmon Survey || — || align=right | 3.5 km || 
|-id=043 bgcolor=#E9E9E9
| 309043 ||  || — || October 27, 2006 || Kitt Peak || Spacewatch || — || align=right | 1.1 km || 
|-id=044 bgcolor=#E9E9E9
| 309044 ||  || — || October 27, 2006 || Mount Lemmon || Mount Lemmon Survey || AST || align=right | 1.7 km || 
|-id=045 bgcolor=#E9E9E9
| 309045 ||  || — || October 27, 2006 || Mount Lemmon || Mount Lemmon Survey || HEN || align=right | 1.1 km || 
|-id=046 bgcolor=#d6d6d6
| 309046 ||  || — || October 27, 2006 || Mount Lemmon || Mount Lemmon Survey || KOR || align=right | 1.2 km || 
|-id=047 bgcolor=#d6d6d6
| 309047 ||  || — || October 27, 2006 || Mount Lemmon || Mount Lemmon Survey || — || align=right | 2.1 km || 
|-id=048 bgcolor=#d6d6d6
| 309048 ||  || — || October 27, 2006 || Mount Lemmon || Mount Lemmon Survey || THB || align=right | 4.6 km || 
|-id=049 bgcolor=#d6d6d6
| 309049 ||  || — || October 28, 2006 || Kitt Peak || Spacewatch || KAR || align=right | 1.0 km || 
|-id=050 bgcolor=#E9E9E9
| 309050 ||  || — || October 28, 2006 || Kitt Peak || Spacewatch || MRX || align=right | 1.1 km || 
|-id=051 bgcolor=#d6d6d6
| 309051 ||  || — || October 28, 2006 || Mount Lemmon || Mount Lemmon Survey || KOR || align=right | 1.3 km || 
|-id=052 bgcolor=#E9E9E9
| 309052 ||  || — || October 27, 2006 || Catalina || CSS || — || align=right | 1.1 km || 
|-id=053 bgcolor=#d6d6d6
| 309053 ||  || — || October 27, 2006 || Mount Lemmon || Mount Lemmon Survey || EMA || align=right | 3.8 km || 
|-id=054 bgcolor=#d6d6d6
| 309054 ||  || — || October 27, 2006 || Kitt Peak || Spacewatch || — || align=right | 2.8 km || 
|-id=055 bgcolor=#E9E9E9
| 309055 ||  || — || October 28, 2006 || Kitt Peak || Spacewatch || — || align=right | 2.1 km || 
|-id=056 bgcolor=#d6d6d6
| 309056 ||  || — || October 28, 2006 || Kitt Peak || Spacewatch || — || align=right | 2.8 km || 
|-id=057 bgcolor=#E9E9E9
| 309057 ||  || — || October 28, 2006 || Kitt Peak || Spacewatch || — || align=right | 1.4 km || 
|-id=058 bgcolor=#E9E9E9
| 309058 ||  || — || October 28, 2006 || Kitt Peak || Spacewatch || — || align=right data-sort-value="0.94" | 940 m || 
|-id=059 bgcolor=#d6d6d6
| 309059 ||  || — || October 28, 2006 || Mount Lemmon || Mount Lemmon Survey || KAR || align=right | 1.3 km || 
|-id=060 bgcolor=#d6d6d6
| 309060 ||  || — || October 28, 2006 || Kitt Peak || Spacewatch || — || align=right | 2.2 km || 
|-id=061 bgcolor=#d6d6d6
| 309061 ||  || — || October 19, 2006 || Kitt Peak || M. W. Buie || — || align=right | 2.9 km || 
|-id=062 bgcolor=#d6d6d6
| 309062 ||  || — || October 19, 2006 || Mount Lemmon || Mount Lemmon Survey || — || align=right | 2.5 km || 
|-id=063 bgcolor=#E9E9E9
| 309063 ||  || — || October 21, 2006 || Apache Point || A. C. Becker || — || align=right | 2.3 km || 
|-id=064 bgcolor=#d6d6d6
| 309064 ||  || — || October 19, 2006 || Catalina || CSS || — || align=right | 3.7 km || 
|-id=065 bgcolor=#d6d6d6
| 309065 ||  || — || October 31, 2006 || Mount Lemmon || Mount Lemmon Survey || EOS || align=right | 3.1 km || 
|-id=066 bgcolor=#d6d6d6
| 309066 ||  || — || October 20, 2006 || Kitt Peak || Spacewatch || — || align=right | 2.2 km || 
|-id=067 bgcolor=#d6d6d6
| 309067 ||  || — || October 20, 2006 || Kitt Peak || Spacewatch || KOR || align=right | 1.4 km || 
|-id=068 bgcolor=#E9E9E9
| 309068 ||  || — || October 19, 2006 || Catalina || CSS || — || align=right | 3.8 km || 
|-id=069 bgcolor=#d6d6d6
| 309069 ||  || — || November 10, 2006 || Kitt Peak || Spacewatch || — || align=right | 2.1 km || 
|-id=070 bgcolor=#d6d6d6
| 309070 ||  || — || November 10, 2006 || Kitt Peak || Spacewatch || — || align=right | 2.5 km || 
|-id=071 bgcolor=#d6d6d6
| 309071 ||  || — || November 10, 2006 || Kitt Peak || Spacewatch || — || align=right | 3.2 km || 
|-id=072 bgcolor=#E9E9E9
| 309072 ||  || — || November 11, 2006 || Catalina || CSS || AGN || align=right | 1.6 km || 
|-id=073 bgcolor=#d6d6d6
| 309073 ||  || — || November 10, 2006 || Kitt Peak || Spacewatch || — || align=right | 4.0 km || 
|-id=074 bgcolor=#d6d6d6
| 309074 ||  || — || November 10, 2006 || Kitt Peak || Spacewatch || — || align=right | 2.7 km || 
|-id=075 bgcolor=#d6d6d6
| 309075 ||  || — || November 10, 2006 || Kitt Peak || Spacewatch || KOR || align=right | 1.5 km || 
|-id=076 bgcolor=#d6d6d6
| 309076 ||  || — || November 11, 2006 || Catalina || CSS || KOR || align=right | 1.7 km || 
|-id=077 bgcolor=#E9E9E9
| 309077 ||  || — || November 12, 2006 || Mount Lemmon || Mount Lemmon Survey || — || align=right | 2.7 km || 
|-id=078 bgcolor=#d6d6d6
| 309078 ||  || — || November 9, 2006 || Kitt Peak || Spacewatch || — || align=right | 2.8 km || 
|-id=079 bgcolor=#d6d6d6
| 309079 ||  || — || November 11, 2006 || Kitt Peak || Spacewatch || KOR || align=right | 1.3 km || 
|-id=080 bgcolor=#d6d6d6
| 309080 ||  || — || November 11, 2006 || Kitt Peak || Spacewatch || — || align=right | 2.9 km || 
|-id=081 bgcolor=#E9E9E9
| 309081 ||  || — || November 11, 2006 || Kitt Peak || Spacewatch || — || align=right | 1.3 km || 
|-id=082 bgcolor=#d6d6d6
| 309082 ||  || — || November 11, 2006 || Kitt Peak || Spacewatch || KAR || align=right | 1.4 km || 
|-id=083 bgcolor=#d6d6d6
| 309083 ||  || — || November 11, 2006 || Kitt Peak || Spacewatch || — || align=right | 3.0 km || 
|-id=084 bgcolor=#d6d6d6
| 309084 ||  || — || November 11, 2006 || Mount Lemmon || Mount Lemmon Survey || — || align=right | 1.9 km || 
|-id=085 bgcolor=#d6d6d6
| 309085 ||  || — || November 11, 2006 || Mount Lemmon || Mount Lemmon Survey || — || align=right | 4.1 km || 
|-id=086 bgcolor=#d6d6d6
| 309086 ||  || — || November 11, 2006 || Kitt Peak || Spacewatch || — || align=right | 3.3 km || 
|-id=087 bgcolor=#d6d6d6
| 309087 ||  || — || November 11, 2006 || Kitt Peak || Spacewatch || — || align=right | 3.5 km || 
|-id=088 bgcolor=#E9E9E9
| 309088 ||  || — || November 13, 2006 || Mount Lemmon || Mount Lemmon Survey || — || align=right | 1.4 km || 
|-id=089 bgcolor=#fefefe
| 309089 ||  || — || November 15, 2006 || Catalina || CSS || — || align=right | 1.0 km || 
|-id=090 bgcolor=#fefefe
| 309090 ||  || — || November 14, 2006 || Socorro || LINEAR || H || align=right data-sort-value="0.69" | 690 m || 
|-id=091 bgcolor=#d6d6d6
| 309091 ||  || — || November 13, 2006 || Mount Lemmon || Mount Lemmon Survey || K-2 || align=right | 1.6 km || 
|-id=092 bgcolor=#E9E9E9
| 309092 ||  || — || November 14, 2006 || Socorro || LINEAR || ADE || align=right | 3.2 km || 
|-id=093 bgcolor=#d6d6d6
| 309093 ||  || — || November 14, 2006 || Kitt Peak || Spacewatch || — || align=right | 3.6 km || 
|-id=094 bgcolor=#d6d6d6
| 309094 ||  || — || November 15, 2006 || Kitt Peak || Spacewatch || — || align=right | 4.1 km || 
|-id=095 bgcolor=#d6d6d6
| 309095 ||  || — || November 15, 2006 || Kitt Peak || Spacewatch || — || align=right | 2.4 km || 
|-id=096 bgcolor=#d6d6d6
| 309096 ||  || — || November 10, 2006 || Kitt Peak || Spacewatch || — || align=right | 3.6 km || 
|-id=097 bgcolor=#d6d6d6
| 309097 ||  || — || November 11, 2006 || Mount Lemmon || Mount Lemmon Survey || — || align=right | 2.3 km || 
|-id=098 bgcolor=#d6d6d6
| 309098 ||  || — || November 1, 2006 || Mount Lemmon || Mount Lemmon Survey || — || align=right | 4.0 km || 
|-id=099 bgcolor=#d6d6d6
| 309099 || 2006 WC || — || November 16, 2006 || 7300 Observatory || W. K. Y. Yeung || — || align=right | 3.0 km || 
|-id=100 bgcolor=#d6d6d6
| 309100 ||  || — || November 16, 2006 || Socorro || LINEAR || EOS || align=right | 3.0 km || 
|}

309101–309200 

|-bgcolor=#d6d6d6
| 309101 ||  || — || November 16, 2006 || Kitt Peak || Spacewatch || — || align=right | 3.5 km || 
|-id=102 bgcolor=#d6d6d6
| 309102 ||  || — || November 16, 2006 || Kitt Peak || Spacewatch || — || align=right | 4.1 km || 
|-id=103 bgcolor=#d6d6d6
| 309103 ||  || — || November 17, 2006 || Mount Lemmon || Mount Lemmon Survey || EOS || align=right | 5.2 km || 
|-id=104 bgcolor=#d6d6d6
| 309104 ||  || — || November 18, 2006 || Kitt Peak || Spacewatch || KAR || align=right | 1.2 km || 
|-id=105 bgcolor=#d6d6d6
| 309105 ||  || — || November 18, 2006 || Kitt Peak || Spacewatch || — || align=right | 2.9 km || 
|-id=106 bgcolor=#E9E9E9
| 309106 ||  || — || November 18, 2006 || Mount Lemmon || Mount Lemmon Survey || — || align=right | 1.4 km || 
|-id=107 bgcolor=#d6d6d6
| 309107 ||  || — || November 18, 2006 || Kitt Peak || Spacewatch || EUP || align=right | 5.7 km || 
|-id=108 bgcolor=#d6d6d6
| 309108 ||  || — || November 18, 2006 || Kitt Peak || Spacewatch || EOS || align=right | 2.7 km || 
|-id=109 bgcolor=#d6d6d6
| 309109 ||  || — || November 19, 2006 || Kitt Peak || Spacewatch || — || align=right | 3.2 km || 
|-id=110 bgcolor=#d6d6d6
| 309110 ||  || — || November 19, 2006 || Kitt Peak || Spacewatch || — || align=right | 3.5 km || 
|-id=111 bgcolor=#d6d6d6
| 309111 ||  || — || November 20, 2006 || Kitt Peak || Spacewatch || — || align=right | 3.4 km || 
|-id=112 bgcolor=#E9E9E9
| 309112 ||  || — || November 21, 2006 || Catalina || CSS || — || align=right | 1.6 km || 
|-id=113 bgcolor=#E9E9E9
| 309113 ||  || — || November 21, 2006 || Socorro || LINEAR || — || align=right | 1.3 km || 
|-id=114 bgcolor=#d6d6d6
| 309114 ||  || — || November 21, 2006 || Mount Lemmon || Mount Lemmon Survey || — || align=right | 3.6 km || 
|-id=115 bgcolor=#d6d6d6
| 309115 ||  || — || November 24, 2006 || Nyukasa || Mount Nyukasa Stn. || — || align=right | 3.2 km || 
|-id=116 bgcolor=#d6d6d6
| 309116 ||  || — || November 19, 2006 || Kitt Peak || Spacewatch || THM || align=right | 2.2 km || 
|-id=117 bgcolor=#d6d6d6
| 309117 ||  || — || November 19, 2006 || Catalina || CSS || — || align=right | 3.6 km || 
|-id=118 bgcolor=#d6d6d6
| 309118 ||  || — || November 20, 2006 || Kitt Peak || Spacewatch || — || align=right | 2.6 km || 
|-id=119 bgcolor=#d6d6d6
| 309119 ||  || — || November 21, 2006 || Mount Lemmon || Mount Lemmon Survey || — || align=right | 2.5 km || 
|-id=120 bgcolor=#d6d6d6
| 309120 ||  || — || November 23, 2006 || Kitt Peak || Spacewatch || — || align=right | 3.7 km || 
|-id=121 bgcolor=#d6d6d6
| 309121 ||  || — || March 26, 2003 || Kitt Peak || Spacewatch || CRO || align=right | 3.0 km || 
|-id=122 bgcolor=#d6d6d6
| 309122 ||  || — || November 24, 2006 || Mount Lemmon || Mount Lemmon Survey || — || align=right | 3.0 km || 
|-id=123 bgcolor=#d6d6d6
| 309123 ||  || — || November 23, 2006 || Mount Lemmon || Mount Lemmon Survey || — || align=right | 3.7 km || 
|-id=124 bgcolor=#d6d6d6
| 309124 ||  || — || November 16, 2006 || Kitt Peak || Spacewatch || EOS || align=right | 5.3 km || 
|-id=125 bgcolor=#E9E9E9
| 309125 ||  || — || November 27, 2006 || Mount Lemmon || Mount Lemmon Survey || — || align=right | 1.2 km || 
|-id=126 bgcolor=#d6d6d6
| 309126 ||  || — || December 9, 2006 || Kitt Peak || Spacewatch || — || align=right | 2.6 km || 
|-id=127 bgcolor=#d6d6d6
| 309127 ||  || — || December 9, 2006 || Kitt Peak || Spacewatch || — || align=right | 2.7 km || 
|-id=128 bgcolor=#d6d6d6
| 309128 ||  || — || December 11, 2006 || Kitt Peak || Spacewatch || — || align=right | 3.2 km || 
|-id=129 bgcolor=#d6d6d6
| 309129 ||  || — || December 12, 2006 || Kitt Peak || Spacewatch || — || align=right | 3.7 km || 
|-id=130 bgcolor=#E9E9E9
| 309130 ||  || — || December 12, 2006 || Catalina || CSS || — || align=right | 1.4 km || 
|-id=131 bgcolor=#d6d6d6
| 309131 ||  || — || December 13, 2006 || Catalina || CSS || HYG || align=right | 3.4 km || 
|-id=132 bgcolor=#d6d6d6
| 309132 ||  || — || December 12, 2006 || Kitt Peak || Spacewatch || — || align=right | 3.0 km || 
|-id=133 bgcolor=#d6d6d6
| 309133 ||  || — || December 11, 2006 || Kitt Peak || Spacewatch || — || align=right | 4.5 km || 
|-id=134 bgcolor=#d6d6d6
| 309134 ||  || — || December 11, 2006 || Socorro || LINEAR || — || align=right | 6.7 km || 
|-id=135 bgcolor=#d6d6d6
| 309135 ||  || — || December 11, 2006 || Kitt Peak || Spacewatch || CRO || align=right | 3.5 km || 
|-id=136 bgcolor=#E9E9E9
| 309136 ||  || — || December 11, 2006 || Kitt Peak || Spacewatch || — || align=right | 2.1 km || 
|-id=137 bgcolor=#d6d6d6
| 309137 ||  || — || December 12, 2006 || Socorro || LINEAR || — || align=right | 5.3 km || 
|-id=138 bgcolor=#E9E9E9
| 309138 ||  || — || December 12, 2006 || Mount Lemmon || Mount Lemmon Survey || — || align=right | 1.1 km || 
|-id=139 bgcolor=#C7FF8F
| 309139 ||  || — || December 14, 2006 || Mount Lemmon || Mount Lemmon Survey || centaurcritical || align=right | 39 km || 
|-id=140 bgcolor=#E9E9E9
| 309140 ||  || — || December 15, 2006 || Socorro || LINEAR || — || align=right | 2.0 km || 
|-id=141 bgcolor=#d6d6d6
| 309141 ||  || — || December 14, 2006 || Kitt Peak || Spacewatch || — || align=right | 4.0 km || 
|-id=142 bgcolor=#d6d6d6
| 309142 ||  || — || December 14, 2006 || Kitt Peak || Spacewatch || — || align=right | 2.9 km || 
|-id=143 bgcolor=#d6d6d6
| 309143 ||  || — || December 13, 2006 || Mount Lemmon || Mount Lemmon Survey || — || align=right | 7.3 km || 
|-id=144 bgcolor=#d6d6d6
| 309144 ||  || — || December 16, 2006 || Mount Lemmon || Mount Lemmon Survey || — || align=right | 3.7 km || 
|-id=145 bgcolor=#d6d6d6
| 309145 ||  || — || December 19, 2006 || Eskridge || Farpoint Obs. || — || align=right | 3.5 km || 
|-id=146 bgcolor=#d6d6d6
| 309146 ||  || — || December 20, 2006 || Palomar || NEAT || — || align=right | 5.0 km || 
|-id=147 bgcolor=#d6d6d6
| 309147 ||  || — || December 23, 2006 || Eskridge || Farpoint Obs. || EOS || align=right | 3.0 km || 
|-id=148 bgcolor=#d6d6d6
| 309148 ||  || — || December 21, 2006 || Mount Lemmon || Mount Lemmon Survey || — || align=right | 2.9 km || 
|-id=149 bgcolor=#d6d6d6
| 309149 ||  || — || December 21, 2006 || Kitt Peak || Spacewatch || URS || align=right | 4.8 km || 
|-id=150 bgcolor=#d6d6d6
| 309150 ||  || — || December 21, 2006 || Kitt Peak || Spacewatch || — || align=right | 3.8 km || 
|-id=151 bgcolor=#d6d6d6
| 309151 ||  || — || December 21, 2006 || Kitt Peak || Spacewatch || — || align=right | 4.2 km || 
|-id=152 bgcolor=#d6d6d6
| 309152 ||  || — || December 26, 2006 || Kitt Peak || Spacewatch || — || align=right | 2.2 km || 
|-id=153 bgcolor=#d6d6d6
| 309153 ||  || — || December 26, 2006 || Catalina || CSS || TIR || align=right | 3.6 km || 
|-id=154 bgcolor=#d6d6d6
| 309154 ||  || — || January 8, 2007 || Mount Lemmon || Mount Lemmon Survey || THM || align=right | 3.0 km || 
|-id=155 bgcolor=#d6d6d6
| 309155 ||  || — || January 8, 2007 || Mount Lemmon || Mount Lemmon Survey || THM || align=right | 2.5 km || 
|-id=156 bgcolor=#d6d6d6
| 309156 ||  || — || January 8, 2007 || Mount Lemmon || Mount Lemmon Survey || — || align=right | 3.6 km || 
|-id=157 bgcolor=#fefefe
| 309157 ||  || — || January 9, 2007 || Catalina || CSS || H || align=right | 1.1 km || 
|-id=158 bgcolor=#d6d6d6
| 309158 ||  || — || January 8, 2007 || Kitt Peak || Spacewatch || VER || align=right | 3.8 km || 
|-id=159 bgcolor=#d6d6d6
| 309159 ||  || — || January 15, 2007 || Catalina || CSS || — || align=right | 4.3 km || 
|-id=160 bgcolor=#E9E9E9
| 309160 ||  || — || January 10, 2007 || Catalina || CSS || — || align=right | 1.2 km || 
|-id=161 bgcolor=#d6d6d6
| 309161 ||  || — || January 10, 2007 || Mount Lemmon || Mount Lemmon Survey || HYG || align=right | 4.5 km || 
|-id=162 bgcolor=#E9E9E9
| 309162 ||  || — || January 10, 2007 || Mount Lemmon || Mount Lemmon Survey || WIT || align=right | 1.1 km || 
|-id=163 bgcolor=#d6d6d6
| 309163 ||  || — || January 9, 2007 || Kitt Peak || Spacewatch || — || align=right | 4.1 km || 
|-id=164 bgcolor=#d6d6d6
| 309164 ||  || — || January 17, 2007 || Palomar || NEAT || EUP || align=right | 5.2 km || 
|-id=165 bgcolor=#fefefe
| 309165 ||  || — || January 17, 2007 || Catalina || CSS || H || align=right data-sort-value="0.69" | 690 m || 
|-id=166 bgcolor=#FA8072
| 309166 ||  || — || January 23, 2007 || Socorro || LINEAR || — || align=right | 1.6 km || 
|-id=167 bgcolor=#d6d6d6
| 309167 ||  || — || January 17, 2007 || Palomar || NEAT || — || align=right | 4.1 km || 
|-id=168 bgcolor=#fefefe
| 309168 ||  || — || January 22, 2007 || Lulin Observatory || H.-C. Lin, Q.-z. Ye || H || align=right data-sort-value="0.80" | 800 m || 
|-id=169 bgcolor=#d6d6d6
| 309169 ||  || — || January 24, 2007 || Kitt Peak || Spacewatch || — || align=right | 3.7 km || 
|-id=170 bgcolor=#d6d6d6
| 309170 ||  || — || January 24, 2007 || Mount Lemmon || Mount Lemmon Survey || HYG || align=right | 2.6 km || 
|-id=171 bgcolor=#fefefe
| 309171 ||  || — || January 24, 2007 || Mount Lemmon || Mount Lemmon Survey || — || align=right data-sort-value="0.94" | 940 m || 
|-id=172 bgcolor=#d6d6d6
| 309172 ||  || — || October 23, 2005 || Catalina || CSS || — || align=right | 3.9 km || 
|-id=173 bgcolor=#d6d6d6
| 309173 ||  || — || January 26, 2007 || Kitt Peak || Spacewatch || — || align=right | 3.9 km || 
|-id=174 bgcolor=#d6d6d6
| 309174 ||  || — || January 27, 2007 || Kitt Peak || Spacewatch || HYG || align=right | 3.1 km || 
|-id=175 bgcolor=#E9E9E9
| 309175 ||  || — || January 27, 2007 || Mount Lemmon || Mount Lemmon Survey || — || align=right | 1.0 km || 
|-id=176 bgcolor=#E9E9E9
| 309176 ||  || — || January 28, 2007 || Mount Lemmon || Mount Lemmon Survey || — || align=right | 1.5 km || 
|-id=177 bgcolor=#E9E9E9
| 309177 ||  || — || February 6, 2007 || Kitt Peak || Spacewatch || — || align=right | 1.1 km || 
|-id=178 bgcolor=#fefefe
| 309178 ||  || — || February 8, 2007 || Mayhill || A. Lowe || — || align=right | 1.1 km || 
|-id=179 bgcolor=#d6d6d6
| 309179 ||  || — || February 6, 2007 || Kitt Peak || Spacewatch || — || align=right | 2.7 km || 
|-id=180 bgcolor=#E9E9E9
| 309180 ||  || — || February 6, 2007 || Palomar || NEAT || — || align=right | 1.4 km || 
|-id=181 bgcolor=#d6d6d6
| 309181 ||  || — || February 6, 2007 || Palomar || NEAT || 7:4 || align=right | 5.0 km || 
|-id=182 bgcolor=#d6d6d6
| 309182 ||  || — || February 6, 2007 || Palomar || NEAT || — || align=right | 4.3 km || 
|-id=183 bgcolor=#E9E9E9
| 309183 ||  || — || February 8, 2007 || Palomar || NEAT || — || align=right | 1.6 km || 
|-id=184 bgcolor=#d6d6d6
| 309184 ||  || — || February 9, 2007 || Catalina || CSS || — || align=right | 4.8 km || 
|-id=185 bgcolor=#d6d6d6
| 309185 ||  || — || February 10, 2007 || Palomar || NEAT || — || align=right | 4.2 km || 
|-id=186 bgcolor=#d6d6d6
| 309186 ||  || — || February 13, 2007 || Socorro || LINEAR || — || align=right | 4.5 km || 
|-id=187 bgcolor=#fefefe
| 309187 ||  || — || February 16, 2007 || Palomar || NEAT || H || align=right data-sort-value="0.59" | 590 m || 
|-id=188 bgcolor=#fefefe
| 309188 ||  || — || February 23, 2007 || Siding Spring || SSS || H || align=right data-sort-value="0.64" | 640 m || 
|-id=189 bgcolor=#d6d6d6
| 309189 ||  || — || February 21, 2007 || Kitt Peak || Spacewatch || HYG || align=right | 3.6 km || 
|-id=190 bgcolor=#d6d6d6
| 309190 ||  || — || February 23, 2007 || Catalina || CSS || EUP || align=right | 4.1 km || 
|-id=191 bgcolor=#d6d6d6
| 309191 ||  || — || March 10, 2007 || Kitt Peak || Spacewatch || EOS || align=right | 1.9 km || 
|-id=192 bgcolor=#fefefe
| 309192 ||  || — || March 9, 2007 || Mount Lemmon || Mount Lemmon Survey || — || align=right data-sort-value="0.85" | 850 m || 
|-id=193 bgcolor=#d6d6d6
| 309193 ||  || — || March 10, 2007 || Kitt Peak || Spacewatch || — || align=right | 3.7 km || 
|-id=194 bgcolor=#E9E9E9
| 309194 ||  || — || March 10, 2007 || Kitt Peak || Spacewatch || — || align=right | 1.5 km || 
|-id=195 bgcolor=#E9E9E9
| 309195 ||  || — || March 10, 2007 || Mount Lemmon || Mount Lemmon Survey || EUN || align=right | 1.7 km || 
|-id=196 bgcolor=#E9E9E9
| 309196 ||  || — || March 9, 2007 || Mount Lemmon || Mount Lemmon Survey || — || align=right | 1.9 km || 
|-id=197 bgcolor=#fefefe
| 309197 ||  || — || March 12, 2007 || Mount Lemmon || Mount Lemmon Survey || — || align=right data-sort-value="0.94" | 940 m || 
|-id=198 bgcolor=#E9E9E9
| 309198 ||  || — || March 15, 2007 || Kitt Peak || Spacewatch || — || align=right | 3.3 km || 
|-id=199 bgcolor=#E9E9E9
| 309199 ||  || — || March 10, 2007 || Purple Mountain || PMO NEO || — || align=right | 1.8 km || 
|-id=200 bgcolor=#d6d6d6
| 309200 ||  || — || March 8, 2007 || Palomar || NEAT || — || align=right | 6.2 km || 
|}

309201–309300 

|-bgcolor=#d6d6d6
| 309201 ||  || — || March 12, 2007 || Catalina || CSS || EOS || align=right | 3.1 km || 
|-id=202 bgcolor=#d6d6d6
| 309202 ||  || — || March 16, 2007 || Catalina || CSS || LIX || align=right | 5.2 km || 
|-id=203 bgcolor=#FFC2E0
| 309203 || 2007 GG || — || April 7, 2007 || Mauna Kea || D. J. Tholen || AMO +1km || align=right data-sort-value="0.98" | 980 m || 
|-id=204 bgcolor=#d6d6d6
| 309204 ||  || — || April 12, 2007 || Črni Vrh || Črni Vrh || — || align=right | 5.0 km || 
|-id=205 bgcolor=#d6d6d6
| 309205 ||  || — || April 11, 2007 || Catalina || CSS || — || align=right | 3.9 km || 
|-id=206 bgcolor=#fefefe
| 309206 Mažvydas ||  ||  || April 14, 2007 || Moletai || K. Černis, J. Zdanavičius || H || align=right data-sort-value="0.89" | 890 m || 
|-id=207 bgcolor=#fefefe
| 309207 ||  || — || April 15, 2007 || Catalina || CSS || H || align=right data-sort-value="0.84" | 840 m || 
|-id=208 bgcolor=#fefefe
| 309208 ||  || — || April 22, 2007 || Ottmarsheim || C. Rinner || H || align=right data-sort-value="0.86" | 860 m || 
|-id=209 bgcolor=#d6d6d6
| 309209 ||  || — || April 19, 2007 || Pla D'Arguines || R. Ferrando || VER || align=right | 4.3 km || 
|-id=210 bgcolor=#E9E9E9
| 309210 ||  || — || April 19, 2007 || Mount Lemmon || Mount Lemmon Survey || — || align=right | 2.3 km || 
|-id=211 bgcolor=#fefefe
| 309211 ||  || — || April 25, 2007 || Mount Lemmon || Mount Lemmon Survey || — || align=right data-sort-value="0.91" | 910 m || 
|-id=212 bgcolor=#fefefe
| 309212 ||  || — || May 10, 2007 || Mayhill || A. Lowe || NYS || align=right | 1.0 km || 
|-id=213 bgcolor=#fefefe
| 309213 ||  || — || May 11, 2007 || Catalina || CSS || — || align=right | 1.0 km || 
|-id=214 bgcolor=#FFC2E0
| 309214 || 2007 LL || — || June 8, 2007 || Catalina || CSS || ATEcritical || align=right data-sort-value="0.30" | 300 m || 
|-id=215 bgcolor=#FA8072
| 309215 ||  || — || June 14, 2007 || Catalina || CSS || — || align=right | 1.9 km || 
|-id=216 bgcolor=#d6d6d6
| 309216 ||  || — || June 21, 2007 || Mount Lemmon || Mount Lemmon Survey || Tj (2.95) || align=right | 5.4 km || 
|-id=217 bgcolor=#fefefe
| 309217 ||  || — || July 10, 2007 || Siding Spring || SSS || — || align=right | 1.2 km || 
|-id=218 bgcolor=#fefefe
| 309218 ||  || — || July 24, 2007 || Reedy Creek || J. Broughton || — || align=right | 1.0 km || 
|-id=219 bgcolor=#fefefe
| 309219 ||  || — || August 11, 2007 || Socorro || LINEAR || — || align=right | 1.8 km || 
|-id=220 bgcolor=#fefefe
| 309220 ||  || — || August 8, 2007 || Socorro || LINEAR || — || align=right data-sort-value="0.97" | 970 m || 
|-id=221 bgcolor=#fefefe
| 309221 ||  || — || August 9, 2007 || Socorro || LINEAR || NYS || align=right data-sort-value="0.77" | 770 m || 
|-id=222 bgcolor=#fefefe
| 309222 ||  || — || August 9, 2007 || Socorro || LINEAR || PHO || align=right | 1.3 km || 
|-id=223 bgcolor=#fefefe
| 309223 ||  || — || August 9, 2007 || Socorro || LINEAR || — || align=right | 2.0 km || 
|-id=224 bgcolor=#fefefe
| 309224 ||  || — || August 9, 2007 || Socorro || LINEAR || — || align=right data-sort-value="0.89" | 890 m || 
|-id=225 bgcolor=#fefefe
| 309225 ||  || — || August 10, 2007 || Kitt Peak || Spacewatch || NYS || align=right data-sort-value="0.68" | 680 m || 
|-id=226 bgcolor=#fefefe
| 309226 ||  || — || August 14, 2007 || Siding Spring || SSS || ERI || align=right | 1.9 km || 
|-id=227 bgcolor=#fefefe
| 309227 Tsukiko || 2007 QC ||  || August 16, 2007 || San Marcello || M. Mazzucato, F. Dolfi || NYS || align=right data-sort-value="0.66" | 660 m || 
|-id=228 bgcolor=#fefefe
| 309228 ||  || — || August 16, 2007 || Črni Vrh || Črni Vrh || NYS || align=right data-sort-value="0.77" | 770 m || 
|-id=229 bgcolor=#fefefe
| 309229 ||  || — || August 18, 2007 || Gaisberg || R. Gierlinger || — || align=right data-sort-value="0.68" | 680 m || 
|-id=230 bgcolor=#fefefe
| 309230 ||  || — || August 21, 2007 || Anderson Mesa || LONEOS || MAS || align=right data-sort-value="0.87" | 870 m || 
|-id=231 bgcolor=#fefefe
| 309231 ||  || — || August 22, 2007 || Socorro || LINEAR || MAS || align=right | 1.1 km || 
|-id=232 bgcolor=#fefefe
| 309232 ||  || — || August 22, 2007 || Socorro || LINEAR || NYS || align=right data-sort-value="0.84" | 840 m || 
|-id=233 bgcolor=#fefefe
| 309233 ||  || — || August 23, 2007 || Kitt Peak || Spacewatch || — || align=right data-sort-value="0.77" | 770 m || 
|-id=234 bgcolor=#fefefe
| 309234 ||  || — || August 23, 2007 || Kitt Peak || Spacewatch || MAS || align=right data-sort-value="0.75" | 750 m || 
|-id=235 bgcolor=#E9E9E9
| 309235 ||  || — || August 24, 2007 || Kitt Peak || Spacewatch || — || align=right | 1.2 km || 
|-id=236 bgcolor=#fefefe
| 309236 || 2007 RW || — || September 3, 2007 || Eskridge || G. Hug || V || align=right data-sort-value="0.85" | 850 m || 
|-id=237 bgcolor=#fefefe
| 309237 ||  || — || September 4, 2007 || Junk Bond || D. Healy || NYS || align=right data-sort-value="0.93" | 930 m || 
|-id=238 bgcolor=#fefefe
| 309238 ||  || — || September 11, 2007 || Great Shefford || P. Birtwhistle || — || align=right data-sort-value="0.92" | 920 m || 
|-id=239 bgcolor=#C2E0FF
| 309239 ||  || — || September 9, 2007 || Palomar || Palomar Obs. || centaur || align=right | 194 km || 
|-id=240 bgcolor=#fefefe
| 309240 ||  || — || September 10, 2007 || Dauban || Chante-Perdrix Obs. || V || align=right data-sort-value="0.86" | 860 m || 
|-id=241 bgcolor=#fefefe
| 309241 ||  || — || September 13, 2007 || Catalina || CSS || — || align=right | 1.5 km || 
|-id=242 bgcolor=#fefefe
| 309242 ||  || — || September 4, 2007 || Antares || ARO || V || align=right data-sort-value="0.86" | 860 m || 
|-id=243 bgcolor=#fefefe
| 309243 ||  || — || September 4, 2007 || Catalina || CSS || NYS || align=right data-sort-value="0.73" | 730 m || 
|-id=244 bgcolor=#E9E9E9
| 309244 ||  || — || September 4, 2007 || Mount Lemmon || Mount Lemmon Survey || — || align=right data-sort-value="0.98" | 980 m || 
|-id=245 bgcolor=#fefefe
| 309245 ||  || — || September 4, 2007 || Catalina || CSS || V || align=right data-sort-value="0.97" | 970 m || 
|-id=246 bgcolor=#fefefe
| 309246 ||  || — || September 5, 2007 || Catalina || CSS || — || align=right | 1.1 km || 
|-id=247 bgcolor=#fefefe
| 309247 ||  || — || September 5, 2007 || Catalina || CSS || NYS || align=right | 1.1 km || 
|-id=248 bgcolor=#fefefe
| 309248 ||  || — || September 5, 2007 || Catalina || CSS || — || align=right | 1.2 km || 
|-id=249 bgcolor=#fefefe
| 309249 ||  || — || September 8, 2007 || Anderson Mesa || LONEOS || — || align=right data-sort-value="0.94" | 940 m || 
|-id=250 bgcolor=#E9E9E9
| 309250 ||  || — || September 8, 2007 || Anderson Mesa || LONEOS || — || align=right | 2.3 km || 
|-id=251 bgcolor=#fefefe
| 309251 ||  || — || September 9, 2007 || Mount Lemmon || Mount Lemmon Survey || V || align=right data-sort-value="0.76" | 760 m || 
|-id=252 bgcolor=#fefefe
| 309252 ||  || — || September 9, 2007 || Anderson Mesa || LONEOS || — || align=right data-sort-value="0.90" | 900 m || 
|-id=253 bgcolor=#fefefe
| 309253 ||  || — || September 9, 2007 || Kitt Peak || Spacewatch || — || align=right data-sort-value="0.98" | 980 m || 
|-id=254 bgcolor=#fefefe
| 309254 ||  || — || September 9, 2007 || Kitt Peak || Spacewatch || V || align=right data-sort-value="0.66" | 660 m || 
|-id=255 bgcolor=#fefefe
| 309255 ||  || — || September 9, 2007 || Kitt Peak || Spacewatch || V || align=right | 1.1 km || 
|-id=256 bgcolor=#E9E9E9
| 309256 ||  || — || September 9, 2007 || Kitt Peak || Spacewatch || MAR || align=right | 1.1 km || 
|-id=257 bgcolor=#fefefe
| 309257 ||  || — || September 9, 2007 || Anderson Mesa || LONEOS || NYS || align=right data-sort-value="0.88" | 880 m || 
|-id=258 bgcolor=#fefefe
| 309258 ||  || — || September 10, 2007 || Kitt Peak || Spacewatch || V || align=right data-sort-value="0.97" | 970 m || 
|-id=259 bgcolor=#fefefe
| 309259 ||  || — || September 10, 2007 || Kitt Peak || Spacewatch || MAS || align=right | 1.0 km || 
|-id=260 bgcolor=#fefefe
| 309260 ||  || — || September 10, 2007 || Mount Lemmon || Mount Lemmon Survey || NYS || align=right data-sort-value="0.69" | 690 m || 
|-id=261 bgcolor=#fefefe
| 309261 ||  || — || September 10, 2007 || Kitt Peak || Spacewatch || NYS || align=right data-sort-value="0.87" | 870 m || 
|-id=262 bgcolor=#fefefe
| 309262 ||  || — || September 10, 2007 || Kitt Peak || Spacewatch || NYS || align=right data-sort-value="0.84" | 840 m || 
|-id=263 bgcolor=#fefefe
| 309263 ||  || — || September 10, 2007 || Kitt Peak || Spacewatch || NYS || align=right data-sort-value="0.63" | 630 m || 
|-id=264 bgcolor=#fefefe
| 309264 ||  || — || September 10, 2007 || Kitt Peak || Spacewatch || NYS || align=right data-sort-value="0.93" | 930 m || 
|-id=265 bgcolor=#fefefe
| 309265 ||  || — || September 10, 2007 || Kitt Peak || Spacewatch || NYS || align=right data-sort-value="0.85" | 850 m || 
|-id=266 bgcolor=#fefefe
| 309266 ||  || — || September 11, 2007 || Kitt Peak || Spacewatch || MAS || align=right data-sort-value="0.86" | 860 m || 
|-id=267 bgcolor=#fefefe
| 309267 ||  || — || September 11, 2007 || Kitt Peak || Spacewatch || EUT || align=right data-sort-value="0.59" | 590 m || 
|-id=268 bgcolor=#fefefe
| 309268 ||  || — || September 11, 2007 || Kitt Peak || Spacewatch || MAS || align=right data-sort-value="0.85" | 850 m || 
|-id=269 bgcolor=#fefefe
| 309269 ||  || — || September 11, 2007 || Kitt Peak || Spacewatch || NYS || align=right data-sort-value="0.76" | 760 m || 
|-id=270 bgcolor=#fefefe
| 309270 ||  || — || September 11, 2007 || Kitt Peak || Spacewatch || V || align=right data-sort-value="0.93" | 930 m || 
|-id=271 bgcolor=#fefefe
| 309271 ||  || — || September 11, 2007 || Kitt Peak || Spacewatch || — || align=right data-sort-value="0.90" | 900 m || 
|-id=272 bgcolor=#fefefe
| 309272 ||  || — || September 11, 2007 || Purple Mountain || PMO NEO || MAS || align=right data-sort-value="0.80" | 800 m || 
|-id=273 bgcolor=#FA8072
| 309273 ||  || — || September 12, 2007 || Mount Lemmon || Mount Lemmon Survey || — || align=right data-sort-value="0.69" | 690 m || 
|-id=274 bgcolor=#fefefe
| 309274 ||  || — || September 15, 2007 || Taunus || E. Schwab, R. Kling || — || align=right | 1.8 km || 
|-id=275 bgcolor=#fefefe
| 309275 ||  || — || September 12, 2007 || Catalina || CSS || — || align=right | 1.4 km || 
|-id=276 bgcolor=#fefefe
| 309276 ||  || — || September 14, 2007 || Mount Lemmon || Mount Lemmon Survey || — || align=right | 1.0 km || 
|-id=277 bgcolor=#fefefe
| 309277 ||  || — || September 15, 2007 || Lulin Observatory || LUSS || NYS || align=right data-sort-value="0.74" | 740 m || 
|-id=278 bgcolor=#fefefe
| 309278 ||  || — || September 13, 2007 || Socorro || LINEAR || MAS || align=right data-sort-value="0.88" | 880 m || 
|-id=279 bgcolor=#E9E9E9
| 309279 ||  || — || September 13, 2007 || Socorro || LINEAR || — || align=right | 1.6 km || 
|-id=280 bgcolor=#fefefe
| 309280 ||  || — || September 14, 2007 || Socorro || LINEAR || V || align=right data-sort-value="0.75" | 750 m || 
|-id=281 bgcolor=#fefefe
| 309281 ||  || — || September 12, 2007 || Catalina || CSS || V || align=right | 1.1 km || 
|-id=282 bgcolor=#fefefe
| 309282 ||  || — || September 11, 2007 || Purple Mountain || PMO NEO || FLO || align=right data-sort-value="0.80" | 800 m || 
|-id=283 bgcolor=#fefefe
| 309283 ||  || — || September 12, 2007 || Catalina || CSS || NYS || align=right data-sort-value="0.90" | 900 m || 
|-id=284 bgcolor=#fefefe
| 309284 ||  || — || March 25, 2006 || Kitt Peak || Spacewatch || V || align=right data-sort-value="0.86" | 860 m || 
|-id=285 bgcolor=#fefefe
| 309285 ||  || — || September 12, 2007 || Kitt Peak || Spacewatch || V || align=right data-sort-value="0.64" | 640 m || 
|-id=286 bgcolor=#E9E9E9
| 309286 ||  || — || September 13, 2007 || Kitt Peak || Spacewatch || — || align=right data-sort-value="0.79" | 790 m || 
|-id=287 bgcolor=#fefefe
| 309287 ||  || — || September 10, 2007 || Kitt Peak || Spacewatch || MAS || align=right data-sort-value="0.91" | 910 m || 
|-id=288 bgcolor=#fefefe
| 309288 ||  || — || September 10, 2007 || Kitt Peak || Spacewatch || NYS || align=right data-sort-value="0.69" | 690 m || 
|-id=289 bgcolor=#fefefe
| 309289 ||  || — || September 10, 2007 || Kitt Peak || Spacewatch || — || align=right data-sort-value="0.98" | 980 m || 
|-id=290 bgcolor=#E9E9E9
| 309290 ||  || — || September 14, 2007 || Mount Lemmon || Mount Lemmon Survey || — || align=right | 2.7 km || 
|-id=291 bgcolor=#fefefe
| 309291 ||  || — || September 14, 2007 || Mount Lemmon || Mount Lemmon Survey || — || align=right data-sort-value="0.78" | 780 m || 
|-id=292 bgcolor=#fefefe
| 309292 ||  || — || September 14, 2007 || Mount Lemmon || Mount Lemmon Survey || NYS || align=right data-sort-value="0.80" | 800 m || 
|-id=293 bgcolor=#fefefe
| 309293 ||  || — || September 10, 2007 || Mount Lemmon || Mount Lemmon Survey || V || align=right data-sort-value="0.85" | 850 m || 
|-id=294 bgcolor=#fefefe
| 309294 ||  || — || September 10, 2007 || Kitt Peak || Spacewatch || — || align=right | 1.0 km || 
|-id=295 bgcolor=#fefefe
| 309295 Hourenzhi ||  ||  || August 16, 2007 || XuYi || PMO NEO || MAS || align=right | 1.0 km || 
|-id=296 bgcolor=#fefefe
| 309296 ||  || — || September 11, 2007 || Purple Mountain || PMO NEO || NYS || align=right data-sort-value="0.92" | 920 m || 
|-id=297 bgcolor=#fefefe
| 309297 ||  || — || September 12, 2007 || Catalina || CSS || — || align=right data-sort-value="0.98" | 980 m || 
|-id=298 bgcolor=#fefefe
| 309298 ||  || — || September 14, 2007 || Catalina || CSS || ERI || align=right | 2.1 km || 
|-id=299 bgcolor=#fefefe
| 309299 ||  || — || September 14, 2007 || Mount Lemmon || Mount Lemmon Survey || MAS || align=right data-sort-value="0.94" | 940 m || 
|-id=300 bgcolor=#fefefe
| 309300 ||  || — || September 15, 2007 || Socorro || LINEAR || — || align=right | 1.5 km || 
|}

309301–309400 

|-bgcolor=#fefefe
| 309301 ||  || — || September 15, 2007 || Socorro || LINEAR || NYS || align=right data-sort-value="0.76" | 760 m || 
|-id=302 bgcolor=#fefefe
| 309302 ||  || — || September 15, 2007 || Socorro || LINEAR || — || align=right | 1.2 km || 
|-id=303 bgcolor=#E9E9E9
| 309303 ||  || — || September 12, 2007 || Catalina || CSS || GER || align=right | 1.9 km || 
|-id=304 bgcolor=#fefefe
| 309304 ||  || — || September 14, 2007 || Kitt Peak || Spacewatch || FLO || align=right data-sort-value="0.87" | 870 m || 
|-id=305 bgcolor=#E9E9E9
| 309305 ||  || — || September 14, 2007 || Kitt Peak || Spacewatch || — || align=right data-sort-value="0.52" | 520 m || 
|-id=306 bgcolor=#fefefe
| 309306 ||  || — || September 15, 2007 || Mount Lemmon || Mount Lemmon Survey || MAS || align=right data-sort-value="0.79" | 790 m || 
|-id=307 bgcolor=#fefefe
| 309307 ||  || — || September 15, 2007 || Kitt Peak || Spacewatch || — || align=right data-sort-value="0.85" | 850 m || 
|-id=308 bgcolor=#E9E9E9
| 309308 ||  || — || September 10, 2007 || Mount Lemmon || Mount Lemmon Survey || — || align=right | 1.0 km || 
|-id=309 bgcolor=#fefefe
| 309309 ||  || — || September 12, 2007 || Catalina || CSS || — || align=right data-sort-value="0.93" | 930 m || 
|-id=310 bgcolor=#fefefe
| 309310 ||  || — || September 3, 2007 || Catalina || CSS || V || align=right data-sort-value="0.68" | 680 m || 
|-id=311 bgcolor=#fefefe
| 309311 ||  || — || September 5, 2007 || Catalina || CSS || NYS || align=right data-sort-value="0.86" | 860 m || 
|-id=312 bgcolor=#fefefe
| 309312 ||  || — || September 5, 2007 || Catalina || CSS || — || align=right | 1.1 km || 
|-id=313 bgcolor=#fefefe
| 309313 ||  || — || September 9, 2007 || Kitt Peak || Spacewatch || — || align=right | 1.0 km || 
|-id=314 bgcolor=#fefefe
| 309314 ||  || — || September 13, 2007 || Kitt Peak || Spacewatch || V || align=right data-sort-value="0.91" | 910 m || 
|-id=315 bgcolor=#fefefe
| 309315 ||  || — || September 5, 2007 || Catalina || CSS || — || align=right | 1.2 km || 
|-id=316 bgcolor=#fefefe
| 309316 ||  || — || September 4, 2007 || Catalina || CSS || — || align=right | 1.0 km || 
|-id=317 bgcolor=#fefefe
| 309317 ||  || — || September 5, 2007 || Siding Spring || SSS || — || align=right | 1.6 km || 
|-id=318 bgcolor=#fefefe
| 309318 ||  || — || September 12, 2007 || Catalina || CSS || — || align=right | 1.1 km || 
|-id=319 bgcolor=#FA8072
| 309319 || 2007 SO || — || September 17, 2007 || La Sagra || OAM Obs. || — || align=right | 4.1 km || 
|-id=320 bgcolor=#fefefe
| 309320 ||  || — || September 17, 2007 || La Sagra || OAM Obs. || — || align=right | 1.3 km || 
|-id=321 bgcolor=#fefefe
| 309321 ||  || — || September 16, 2007 || Socorro || LINEAR || — || align=right | 1.2 km || 
|-id=322 bgcolor=#fefefe
| 309322 ||  || — || September 20, 2007 || Remanzacco || Remanzacco Obs. || NYS || align=right data-sort-value="0.72" | 720 m || 
|-id=323 bgcolor=#fefefe
| 309323 ||  || — || September 18, 2007 || Socorro || LINEAR || NYS || align=right data-sort-value="0.99" | 990 m || 
|-id=324 bgcolor=#fefefe
| 309324 ||  || — || September 18, 2007 || Socorro || LINEAR || — || align=right data-sort-value="0.93" | 930 m || 
|-id=325 bgcolor=#E9E9E9
| 309325 ||  || — || September 21, 2007 || Schiaparelli || Schiaparelli Obs. || — || align=right | 1.4 km || 
|-id=326 bgcolor=#fefefe
| 309326 ||  || — || September 18, 2007 || Anderson Mesa || LONEOS || — || align=right data-sort-value="0.97" | 970 m || 
|-id=327 bgcolor=#fefefe
| 309327 ||  || — || September 18, 2007 || Kitt Peak || Spacewatch || MAS || align=right data-sort-value="0.98" | 980 m || 
|-id=328 bgcolor=#fefefe
| 309328 ||  || — || September 18, 2007 || Kitt Peak || Spacewatch || MAS || align=right data-sort-value="0.81" | 810 m || 
|-id=329 bgcolor=#E9E9E9
| 309329 ||  || — || September 20, 2007 || Catalina || CSS || — || align=right | 1.6 km || 
|-id=330 bgcolor=#fefefe
| 309330 ||  || — || September 23, 2007 || Farra d'Isonzo || Farra d'Isonzo || — || align=right data-sort-value="0.95" | 950 m || 
|-id=331 bgcolor=#fefefe
| 309331 ||  || — || September 30, 2007 || Kitt Peak || Spacewatch || — || align=right data-sort-value="0.70" | 700 m || 
|-id=332 bgcolor=#E9E9E9
| 309332 ||  || — || September 19, 2007 || Kitt Peak || Spacewatch || — || align=right data-sort-value="0.99" | 990 m || 
|-id=333 bgcolor=#fefefe
| 309333 ||  || — || September 25, 2007 || Mount Lemmon || Mount Lemmon Survey || V || align=right data-sort-value="0.88" | 880 m || 
|-id=334 bgcolor=#fefefe
| 309334 ||  || — || October 4, 2007 || Kitt Peak || Spacewatch || NYS || align=right data-sort-value="0.72" | 720 m || 
|-id=335 bgcolor=#fefefe
| 309335 ||  || — || October 5, 2007 || La Cañada || J. Lacruz || NYS || align=right data-sort-value="0.69" | 690 m || 
|-id=336 bgcolor=#fefefe
| 309336 ||  || — || October 6, 2007 || Socorro || LINEAR || NYS || align=right data-sort-value="0.78" | 780 m || 
|-id=337 bgcolor=#fefefe
| 309337 ||  || — || October 6, 2007 || Socorro || LINEAR || NYS || align=right data-sort-value="0.76" | 760 m || 
|-id=338 bgcolor=#fefefe
| 309338 ||  || — || October 6, 2007 || Socorro || LINEAR || — || align=right data-sort-value="0.90" | 900 m || 
|-id=339 bgcolor=#fefefe
| 309339 ||  || — || October 6, 2007 || Socorro || LINEAR || MAS || align=right data-sort-value="0.88" | 880 m || 
|-id=340 bgcolor=#fefefe
| 309340 ||  || — || October 6, 2007 || Socorro || LINEAR || MAS || align=right data-sort-value="0.75" | 750 m || 
|-id=341 bgcolor=#E9E9E9
| 309341 ||  || — || October 6, 2007 || Socorro || LINEAR || — || align=right | 1.1 km || 
|-id=342 bgcolor=#fefefe
| 309342 ||  || — || October 9, 2007 || Dauban || Chante-Perdrix Obs. || NYS || align=right data-sort-value="0.82" | 820 m || 
|-id=343 bgcolor=#fefefe
| 309343 ||  || — || October 4, 2007 || Kitt Peak || Spacewatch || — || align=right data-sort-value="0.94" | 940 m || 
|-id=344 bgcolor=#fefefe
| 309344 ||  || — || October 4, 2007 || Kitt Peak || Spacewatch || — || align=right | 1.1 km || 
|-id=345 bgcolor=#fefefe
| 309345 ||  || — || October 5, 2007 || Kitt Peak || Spacewatch || — || align=right | 1.3 km || 
|-id=346 bgcolor=#fefefe
| 309346 ||  || — || October 7, 2007 || Mount Lemmon || Mount Lemmon Survey || MAS || align=right data-sort-value="0.77" | 770 m || 
|-id=347 bgcolor=#fefefe
| 309347 ||  || — || October 7, 2007 || Catalina || CSS || V || align=right data-sort-value="0.69" | 690 m || 
|-id=348 bgcolor=#fefefe
| 309348 ||  || — || September 29, 2003 || Kitt Peak || Spacewatch || NYS || align=right data-sort-value="0.61" | 610 m || 
|-id=349 bgcolor=#fefefe
| 309349 ||  || — || October 4, 2007 || Kitt Peak || Spacewatch || NYScritical || align=right data-sort-value="0.58" | 580 m || 
|-id=350 bgcolor=#fefefe
| 309350 ||  || — || October 4, 2007 || Kitt Peak || Spacewatch || — || align=right | 1.4 km || 
|-id=351 bgcolor=#E9E9E9
| 309351 ||  || — || October 4, 2007 || Kitt Peak || Spacewatch || — || align=right data-sort-value="0.71" | 710 m || 
|-id=352 bgcolor=#fefefe
| 309352 ||  || — || October 4, 2007 || Kitt Peak || Spacewatch || — || align=right | 1.1 km || 
|-id=353 bgcolor=#fefefe
| 309353 ||  || — || October 4, 2007 || Kitt Peak || Spacewatch || — || align=right data-sort-value="0.98" | 980 m || 
|-id=354 bgcolor=#E9E9E9
| 309354 ||  || — || October 5, 2007 || Kitt Peak || Spacewatch || — || align=right | 1.1 km || 
|-id=355 bgcolor=#fefefe
| 309355 ||  || — || October 12, 2007 || Dauban || Chante-Perdrix Obs. || — || align=right | 1.0 km || 
|-id=356 bgcolor=#fefefe
| 309356 ||  || — || October 7, 2007 || Catalina || CSS || — || align=right | 1.4 km || 
|-id=357 bgcolor=#fefefe
| 309357 ||  || — || October 14, 2007 || Altschwendt || W. Ries || MAS || align=right data-sort-value="0.68" | 680 m || 
|-id=358 bgcolor=#fefefe
| 309358 ||  || — || October 10, 2007 || Goodricke-Pigott || R. A. Tucker || — || align=right | 1.2 km || 
|-id=359 bgcolor=#E9E9E9
| 309359 ||  || — || October 14, 2007 || Kleť || Kleť Obs. || — || align=right | 1.5 km || 
|-id=360 bgcolor=#E9E9E9
| 309360 ||  || — || October 13, 2007 || Goodricke-Pigott || R. A. Tucker || — || align=right | 2.1 km || 
|-id=361 bgcolor=#fefefe
| 309361 ||  || — || October 4, 2007 || Catalina || CSS || MAS || align=right data-sort-value="0.78" | 780 m || 
|-id=362 bgcolor=#E9E9E9
| 309362 ||  || — || October 8, 2007 || Mount Lemmon || Mount Lemmon Survey || — || align=right data-sort-value="0.90" | 900 m || 
|-id=363 bgcolor=#fefefe
| 309363 ||  || — || October 8, 2007 || Mount Lemmon || Mount Lemmon Survey || NYS || align=right data-sort-value="0.76" | 760 m || 
|-id=364 bgcolor=#E9E9E9
| 309364 ||  || — || October 7, 2007 || Catalina || CSS || — || align=right | 2.3 km || 
|-id=365 bgcolor=#fefefe
| 309365 ||  || — || October 8, 2007 || Anderson Mesa || LONEOS || NYS || align=right data-sort-value="0.89" | 890 m || 
|-id=366 bgcolor=#fefefe
| 309366 ||  || — || October 8, 2007 || Mount Lemmon || Mount Lemmon Survey || NYS || align=right data-sort-value="0.82" | 820 m || 
|-id=367 bgcolor=#fefefe
| 309367 ||  || — || October 8, 2007 || Mount Lemmon || Mount Lemmon Survey || NYS || align=right data-sort-value="0.90" | 900 m || 
|-id=368 bgcolor=#E9E9E9
| 309368 ||  || — || October 8, 2007 || Mount Lemmon || Mount Lemmon Survey || — || align=right data-sort-value="0.89" | 890 m || 
|-id=369 bgcolor=#fefefe
| 309369 ||  || — || October 8, 2007 || Mount Lemmon || Mount Lemmon Survey || — || align=right data-sort-value="0.93" | 930 m || 
|-id=370 bgcolor=#fefefe
| 309370 ||  || — || October 7, 2007 || Catalina || CSS || — || align=right | 1.1 km || 
|-id=371 bgcolor=#fefefe
| 309371 ||  || — || October 8, 2007 || Catalina || CSS || — || align=right | 1.3 km || 
|-id=372 bgcolor=#fefefe
| 309372 ||  || — || October 8, 2007 || Anderson Mesa || LONEOS || — || align=right | 1.4 km || 
|-id=373 bgcolor=#fefefe
| 309373 ||  || — || October 8, 2007 || Anderson Mesa || LONEOS || — || align=right | 1.2 km || 
|-id=374 bgcolor=#E9E9E9
| 309374 ||  || — || October 8, 2007 || Catalina || CSS || — || align=right | 1.2 km || 
|-id=375 bgcolor=#fefefe
| 309375 ||  || — || October 8, 2007 || Catalina || CSS || — || align=right data-sort-value="0.87" | 870 m || 
|-id=376 bgcolor=#fefefe
| 309376 ||  || — || October 6, 2007 || Kitt Peak || Spacewatch || NYS || align=right data-sort-value="0.75" | 750 m || 
|-id=377 bgcolor=#E9E9E9
| 309377 ||  || — || October 6, 2007 || Kitt Peak || Spacewatch || — || align=right data-sort-value="0.90" | 900 m || 
|-id=378 bgcolor=#E9E9E9
| 309378 ||  || — || October 7, 2007 || Mount Lemmon || Mount Lemmon Survey || — || align=right | 1.2 km || 
|-id=379 bgcolor=#fefefe
| 309379 ||  || — || October 7, 2007 || Mount Lemmon || Mount Lemmon Survey || NYS || align=right data-sort-value="0.93" | 930 m || 
|-id=380 bgcolor=#fefefe
| 309380 ||  || — || October 7, 2007 || Mount Lemmon || Mount Lemmon Survey || NYS || align=right data-sort-value="0.90" | 900 m || 
|-id=381 bgcolor=#fefefe
| 309381 ||  || — || October 7, 2007 || Mount Lemmon || Mount Lemmon Survey || — || align=right | 1.1 km || 
|-id=382 bgcolor=#E9E9E9
| 309382 ||  || — || October 8, 2007 || Mount Lemmon || Mount Lemmon Survey || — || align=right | 1.2 km || 
|-id=383 bgcolor=#fefefe
| 309383 ||  || — || October 7, 2007 || Socorro || LINEAR || V || align=right data-sort-value="0.95" | 950 m || 
|-id=384 bgcolor=#fefefe
| 309384 ||  || — || October 7, 2007 || Socorro || LINEAR || ERI || align=right | 2.2 km || 
|-id=385 bgcolor=#fefefe
| 309385 ||  || — || October 8, 2007 || Socorro || LINEAR || — || align=right data-sort-value="0.93" | 930 m || 
|-id=386 bgcolor=#fefefe
| 309386 ||  || — || October 9, 2007 || Socorro || LINEAR || — || align=right data-sort-value="0.91" | 910 m || 
|-id=387 bgcolor=#fefefe
| 309387 ||  || — || October 9, 2007 || Socorro || LINEAR || V || align=right data-sort-value="0.77" | 770 m || 
|-id=388 bgcolor=#fefefe
| 309388 ||  || — || October 9, 2007 || Socorro || LINEAR || — || align=right data-sort-value="0.85" | 850 m || 
|-id=389 bgcolor=#fefefe
| 309389 ||  || — || October 12, 2007 || Socorro || LINEAR || — || align=right data-sort-value="0.98" | 980 m || 
|-id=390 bgcolor=#E9E9E9
| 309390 ||  || — || October 12, 2007 || Socorro || LINEAR || — || align=right data-sort-value="0.57" | 570 m || 
|-id=391 bgcolor=#fefefe
| 309391 ||  || — || October 13, 2007 || Socorro || LINEAR || NYS || align=right data-sort-value="0.71" | 710 m || 
|-id=392 bgcolor=#fefefe
| 309392 ||  || — || October 13, 2007 || Socorro || LINEAR || FLO || align=right data-sort-value="0.74" | 740 m || 
|-id=393 bgcolor=#fefefe
| 309393 ||  || — || October 13, 2007 || Socorro || LINEAR || — || align=right | 1.1 km || 
|-id=394 bgcolor=#fefefe
| 309394 ||  || — || October 7, 2007 || Catalina || CSS || FLO || align=right data-sort-value="0.88" | 880 m || 
|-id=395 bgcolor=#fefefe
| 309395 ||  || — || October 8, 2007 || Kitt Peak || Spacewatch || MAS || align=right data-sort-value="0.70" | 700 m || 
|-id=396 bgcolor=#fefefe
| 309396 ||  || — || October 8, 2007 || Mount Lemmon || Mount Lemmon Survey || — || align=right | 1.1 km || 
|-id=397 bgcolor=#E9E9E9
| 309397 ||  || — || October 7, 2007 || Kitt Peak || Spacewatch || — || align=right | 1.5 km || 
|-id=398 bgcolor=#E9E9E9
| 309398 ||  || — || October 7, 2007 || Kitt Peak || Spacewatch || GER || align=right | 1.7 km || 
|-id=399 bgcolor=#fefefe
| 309399 ||  || — || October 9, 2007 || Kitt Peak || Spacewatch || MAS || align=right data-sort-value="0.82" | 820 m || 
|-id=400 bgcolor=#E9E9E9
| 309400 ||  || — || October 8, 2007 || Kitt Peak || Spacewatch || — || align=right | 3.4 km || 
|}

309401–309500 

|-bgcolor=#fefefe
| 309401 ||  || — || October 10, 2007 || Kitt Peak || Spacewatch || — || align=right data-sort-value="0.87" | 870 m || 
|-id=402 bgcolor=#fefefe
| 309402 ||  || — || October 14, 2007 || Socorro || LINEAR || — || align=right | 1.1 km || 
|-id=403 bgcolor=#fefefe
| 309403 ||  || — || October 8, 2007 || Mount Lemmon || Mount Lemmon Survey || NYS || align=right data-sort-value="0.91" | 910 m || 
|-id=404 bgcolor=#fefefe
| 309404 ||  || — || October 10, 2007 || Mount Lemmon || Mount Lemmon Survey || V || align=right data-sort-value="0.65" | 650 m || 
|-id=405 bgcolor=#E9E9E9
| 309405 ||  || — || October 10, 2007 || Kitt Peak || Spacewatch || — || align=right | 1.5 km || 
|-id=406 bgcolor=#fefefe
| 309406 ||  || — || October 11, 2007 || Catalina || CSS || — || align=right data-sort-value="0.87" | 870 m || 
|-id=407 bgcolor=#fefefe
| 309407 ||  || — || October 10, 2007 || Mount Lemmon || Mount Lemmon Survey || NYS || align=right data-sort-value="0.72" | 720 m || 
|-id=408 bgcolor=#E9E9E9
| 309408 ||  || — || October 7, 2007 || Catalina || CSS || — || align=right | 3.3 km || 
|-id=409 bgcolor=#fefefe
| 309409 ||  || — || October 11, 2007 || Catalina || CSS || KLI || align=right | 2.1 km || 
|-id=410 bgcolor=#E9E9E9
| 309410 ||  || — || October 13, 2007 || Catalina || CSS || MAR || align=right | 1.6 km || 
|-id=411 bgcolor=#fefefe
| 309411 ||  || — || October 12, 2007 || Kitt Peak || Spacewatch || MAS || align=right data-sort-value="0.80" | 800 m || 
|-id=412 bgcolor=#E9E9E9
| 309412 ||  || — || October 12, 2007 || Kitt Peak || Spacewatch || — || align=right | 1.3 km || 
|-id=413 bgcolor=#E9E9E9
| 309413 ||  || — || October 11, 2007 || Kitt Peak || Spacewatch || — || align=right | 1.5 km || 
|-id=414 bgcolor=#fefefe
| 309414 ||  || — || October 11, 2007 || Kitt Peak || Spacewatch || — || align=right data-sort-value="0.99" | 990 m || 
|-id=415 bgcolor=#fefefe
| 309415 ||  || — || October 13, 2007 || Catalina || CSS || V || align=right data-sort-value="0.92" | 920 m || 
|-id=416 bgcolor=#fefefe
| 309416 ||  || — || October 12, 2007 || Kitt Peak || Spacewatch || NYS || align=right data-sort-value="0.77" | 770 m || 
|-id=417 bgcolor=#fefefe
| 309417 ||  || — || October 14, 2007 || Mount Lemmon || Mount Lemmon Survey || V || align=right data-sort-value="0.95" | 950 m || 
|-id=418 bgcolor=#E9E9E9
| 309418 ||  || — || October 14, 2007 || Mount Lemmon || Mount Lemmon Survey || — || align=right | 2.4 km || 
|-id=419 bgcolor=#fefefe
| 309419 ||  || — || October 9, 2007 || Mount Lemmon || Mount Lemmon Survey || V || align=right data-sort-value="0.84" | 840 m || 
|-id=420 bgcolor=#E9E9E9
| 309420 ||  || — || October 9, 2007 || Catalina || CSS || HNS || align=right | 1.8 km || 
|-id=421 bgcolor=#fefefe
| 309421 ||  || — || October 10, 2007 || Catalina || CSS || — || align=right | 1.1 km || 
|-id=422 bgcolor=#fefefe
| 309422 ||  || — || October 14, 2007 || Kitt Peak || Spacewatch || — || align=right | 1.0 km || 
|-id=423 bgcolor=#E9E9E9
| 309423 ||  || — || October 14, 2007 || Kitt Peak || Spacewatch || MAR || align=right | 1.1 km || 
|-id=424 bgcolor=#fefefe
| 309424 ||  || — || October 15, 2007 || Catalina || CSS || V || align=right data-sort-value="0.94" | 940 m || 
|-id=425 bgcolor=#fefefe
| 309425 ||  || — || October 15, 2007 || Kitt Peak || Spacewatch || NYS || align=right data-sort-value="0.83" | 830 m || 
|-id=426 bgcolor=#fefefe
| 309426 ||  || — || May 25, 2006 || Mauna Kea || P. A. Wiegert || — || align=right data-sort-value="0.92" | 920 m || 
|-id=427 bgcolor=#E9E9E9
| 309427 ||  || — || October 13, 2007 || Mount Lemmon || Mount Lemmon Survey || — || align=right | 1.1 km || 
|-id=428 bgcolor=#E9E9E9
| 309428 ||  || — || October 9, 2007 || Mount Lemmon || Mount Lemmon Survey || — || align=right | 1.1 km || 
|-id=429 bgcolor=#fefefe
| 309429 ||  || — || October 9, 2007 || Catalina || CSS || CIM || align=right | 3.3 km || 
|-id=430 bgcolor=#fefefe
| 309430 ||  || — || October 8, 2007 || Mount Lemmon || Mount Lemmon Survey || — || align=right data-sort-value="0.72" | 720 m || 
|-id=431 bgcolor=#E9E9E9
| 309431 ||  || — || October 9, 2007 || Kitt Peak || Spacewatch || — || align=right | 1.0 km || 
|-id=432 bgcolor=#fefefe
| 309432 ||  || — || October 9, 2007 || Socorro || LINEAR || — || align=right | 1.1 km || 
|-id=433 bgcolor=#fefefe
| 309433 ||  || — || October 19, 2007 || 7300 || W. K. Y. Yeung || MAS || align=right data-sort-value="0.84" | 840 m || 
|-id=434 bgcolor=#fefefe
| 309434 ||  || — || October 17, 2007 || Anderson Mesa || LONEOS || MAS || align=right data-sort-value="0.86" | 860 m || 
|-id=435 bgcolor=#fefefe
| 309435 ||  || — || October 18, 2007 || Mount Lemmon || Mount Lemmon Survey || NYS || align=right data-sort-value="0.68" | 680 m || 
|-id=436 bgcolor=#fefefe
| 309436 ||  || — || October 19, 2007 || Mount Lemmon || Mount Lemmon Survey || NYS || align=right data-sort-value="0.76" | 760 m || 
|-id=437 bgcolor=#E9E9E9
| 309437 ||  || — || October 16, 2007 || Kitt Peak || Spacewatch || — || align=right | 1.00 km || 
|-id=438 bgcolor=#fefefe
| 309438 ||  || — || October 16, 2007 || Kitt Peak || Spacewatch || V || align=right data-sort-value="0.92" | 920 m || 
|-id=439 bgcolor=#fefefe
| 309439 ||  || — || October 19, 2007 || Catalina || CSS || — || align=right | 1.1 km || 
|-id=440 bgcolor=#fefefe
| 309440 ||  || — || October 20, 2007 || Catalina || CSS || — || align=right | 1.3 km || 
|-id=441 bgcolor=#E9E9E9
| 309441 ||  || — || October 20, 2007 || Mount Lemmon || Mount Lemmon Survey || — || align=right | 1.0 km || 
|-id=442 bgcolor=#E9E9E9
| 309442 ||  || — || October 24, 2007 || Mount Lemmon || Mount Lemmon Survey || — || align=right | 1.6 km || 
|-id=443 bgcolor=#fefefe
| 309443 ||  || — || October 30, 2007 || Kitt Peak || Spacewatch || — || align=right | 1.0 km || 
|-id=444 bgcolor=#fefefe
| 309444 ||  || — || October 30, 2007 || Mount Lemmon || Mount Lemmon Survey || MAS || align=right data-sort-value="0.76" | 760 m || 
|-id=445 bgcolor=#fefefe
| 309445 ||  || — || October 30, 2007 || Mount Lemmon || Mount Lemmon Survey || — || align=right | 1.2 km || 
|-id=446 bgcolor=#fefefe
| 309446 ||  || — || October 30, 2007 || Mount Lemmon || Mount Lemmon Survey || NYS || align=right data-sort-value="0.80" | 800 m || 
|-id=447 bgcolor=#fefefe
| 309447 ||  || — || October 31, 2007 || Mount Lemmon || Mount Lemmon Survey || MAS || align=right data-sort-value="0.80" | 800 m || 
|-id=448 bgcolor=#fefefe
| 309448 ||  || — || October 30, 2007 || Mount Lemmon || Mount Lemmon Survey || — || align=right | 1.1 km || 
|-id=449 bgcolor=#E9E9E9
| 309449 ||  || — || October 30, 2007 || Kitt Peak || Spacewatch || — || align=right | 1.1 km || 
|-id=450 bgcolor=#E9E9E9
| 309450 ||  || — || October 30, 2007 || Kitt Peak || Spacewatch || — || align=right | 1.1 km || 
|-id=451 bgcolor=#E9E9E9
| 309451 ||  || — || October 30, 2007 || Kitt Peak || Spacewatch || — || align=right | 1.5 km || 
|-id=452 bgcolor=#fefefe
| 309452 ||  || — || October 30, 2007 || Kitt Peak || Spacewatch || MAS || align=right data-sort-value="0.99" | 990 m || 
|-id=453 bgcolor=#E9E9E9
| 309453 ||  || — || October 30, 2007 || Kitt Peak || Spacewatch || — || align=right | 1.4 km || 
|-id=454 bgcolor=#E9E9E9
| 309454 ||  || — || October 31, 2007 || Kitt Peak || Spacewatch || — || align=right | 1.0 km || 
|-id=455 bgcolor=#fefefe
| 309455 ||  || — || October 19, 2007 || Anderson Mesa || LONEOS || — || align=right | 1.3 km || 
|-id=456 bgcolor=#fefefe
| 309456 ||  || — || October 21, 2007 || Mount Lemmon || Mount Lemmon Survey || — || align=right | 1.1 km || 
|-id=457 bgcolor=#fefefe
| 309457 ||  || — || October 16, 2007 || Mount Lemmon || Mount Lemmon Survey || — || align=right | 1.1 km || 
|-id=458 bgcolor=#fefefe
| 309458 ||  || — || October 18, 2007 || Socorro || LINEAR || — || align=right data-sort-value="0.98" | 980 m || 
|-id=459 bgcolor=#E9E9E9
| 309459 ||  || — || October 21, 2007 || Mount Lemmon || Mount Lemmon Survey || — || align=right | 1.4 km || 
|-id=460 bgcolor=#fefefe
| 309460 ||  || — || November 1, 2007 || 7300 || W. K. Y. Yeung || — || align=right data-sort-value="0.90" | 900 m || 
|-id=461 bgcolor=#E9E9E9
| 309461 ||  || — || November 1, 2007 || Kitt Peak || Spacewatch || — || align=right | 1.2 km || 
|-id=462 bgcolor=#E9E9E9
| 309462 ||  || — || November 4, 2007 || Mount Lemmon || Mount Lemmon Survey || BRU || align=right | 4.6 km || 
|-id=463 bgcolor=#E9E9E9
| 309463 ||  || — || November 3, 2007 || Needville || Needville Obs. || — || align=right | 1.2 km || 
|-id=464 bgcolor=#fefefe
| 309464 ||  || — || November 1, 2007 || Mount Lemmon || Mount Lemmon Survey || MAS || align=right data-sort-value="0.81" | 810 m || 
|-id=465 bgcolor=#fefefe
| 309465 ||  || — || November 2, 2007 || Kitt Peak || Spacewatch || — || align=right | 1.1 km || 
|-id=466 bgcolor=#E9E9E9
| 309466 ||  || — || November 3, 2007 || Mount Lemmon || Mount Lemmon Survey || — || align=right | 2.3 km || 
|-id=467 bgcolor=#E9E9E9
| 309467 ||  || — || November 1, 2007 || Kitt Peak || Spacewatch || — || align=right | 1.0 km || 
|-id=468 bgcolor=#E9E9E9
| 309468 ||  || — || November 1, 2007 || Kitt Peak || Spacewatch || MIT || align=right | 3.8 km || 
|-id=469 bgcolor=#E9E9E9
| 309469 ||  || — || November 1, 2007 || Kitt Peak || Spacewatch || — || align=right | 1.3 km || 
|-id=470 bgcolor=#fefefe
| 309470 ||  || — || November 3, 2007 || Kitt Peak || Spacewatch || — || align=right data-sort-value="0.92" | 920 m || 
|-id=471 bgcolor=#E9E9E9
| 309471 ||  || — || November 3, 2007 || Kitt Peak || Spacewatch || — || align=right | 1.2 km || 
|-id=472 bgcolor=#fefefe
| 309472 ||  || — || November 7, 2007 || Calvin-Rehoboth || L. A. Molnar || — || align=right data-sort-value="0.87" | 870 m || 
|-id=473 bgcolor=#fefefe
| 309473 ||  || — || November 9, 2007 || Calvin-Rehoboth || L. A. Molnar || — || align=right data-sort-value="0.86" | 860 m || 
|-id=474 bgcolor=#d6d6d6
| 309474 ||  || — || November 2, 2007 || Purple Mountain || PMO NEO || — || align=right | 4.9 km || 
|-id=475 bgcolor=#E9E9E9
| 309475 ||  || — || November 3, 2007 || Kitt Peak || Spacewatch || — || align=right data-sort-value="0.83" | 830 m || 
|-id=476 bgcolor=#E9E9E9
| 309476 ||  || — || November 3, 2007 || Kitt Peak || Spacewatch || — || align=right data-sort-value="0.98" | 980 m || 
|-id=477 bgcolor=#E9E9E9
| 309477 ||  || — || November 3, 2007 || Kitt Peak || Spacewatch || — || align=right | 1.2 km || 
|-id=478 bgcolor=#E9E9E9
| 309478 ||  || — || November 3, 2007 || Kitt Peak || Spacewatch || — || align=right data-sort-value="0.90" | 900 m || 
|-id=479 bgcolor=#E9E9E9
| 309479 ||  || — || November 3, 2007 || Kitt Peak || Spacewatch || RAF || align=right | 1.4 km || 
|-id=480 bgcolor=#E9E9E9
| 309480 ||  || — || November 4, 2007 || Mount Lemmon || Mount Lemmon Survey || — || align=right | 1.1 km || 
|-id=481 bgcolor=#E9E9E9
| 309481 ||  || — || November 4, 2007 || Kitt Peak || Spacewatch || — || align=right | 1.2 km || 
|-id=482 bgcolor=#E9E9E9
| 309482 ||  || — || November 4, 2007 || Kitt Peak || Spacewatch || — || align=right | 1.6 km || 
|-id=483 bgcolor=#E9E9E9
| 309483 ||  || — || November 2, 2007 || Kitt Peak || Spacewatch || — || align=right | 1.2 km || 
|-id=484 bgcolor=#E9E9E9
| 309484 ||  || — || November 5, 2007 || Kitt Peak || Spacewatch || — || align=right | 1.2 km || 
|-id=485 bgcolor=#E9E9E9
| 309485 ||  || — || November 8, 2007 || Mount Lemmon || Mount Lemmon Survey || — || align=right | 1.9 km || 
|-id=486 bgcolor=#fefefe
| 309486 ||  || — || November 7, 2007 || Mount Lemmon || Mount Lemmon Survey || — || align=right data-sort-value="0.94" | 940 m || 
|-id=487 bgcolor=#fefefe
| 309487 ||  || — || November 11, 2007 || Mount Lemmon || Mount Lemmon Survey || — || align=right data-sort-value="0.78" | 780 m || 
|-id=488 bgcolor=#E9E9E9
| 309488 ||  || — || November 11, 2007 || Catalina || CSS || MAR || align=right | 1.5 km || 
|-id=489 bgcolor=#E9E9E9
| 309489 ||  || — || November 11, 2007 || Mount Lemmon || Mount Lemmon Survey || — || align=right data-sort-value="0.85" | 850 m || 
|-id=490 bgcolor=#E9E9E9
| 309490 ||  || — || November 13, 2007 || Kitt Peak || Spacewatch || — || align=right | 1.1 km || 
|-id=491 bgcolor=#E9E9E9
| 309491 ||  || — || November 8, 2007 || Catalina || CSS || MAR || align=right | 1.2 km || 
|-id=492 bgcolor=#fefefe
| 309492 ||  || — || November 15, 2007 || Anderson Mesa || LONEOS || V || align=right data-sort-value="0.74" | 740 m || 
|-id=493 bgcolor=#E9E9E9
| 309493 ||  || — || November 15, 2007 || Socorro || LINEAR || MAR || align=right | 1.4 km || 
|-id=494 bgcolor=#fefefe
| 309494 ||  || — || November 13, 2007 || Catalina || CSS || PHO || align=right | 1.5 km || 
|-id=495 bgcolor=#E9E9E9
| 309495 ||  || — || November 14, 2007 || Kitt Peak || Spacewatch || — || align=right | 1.4 km || 
|-id=496 bgcolor=#E9E9E9
| 309496 ||  || — || November 14, 2007 || Mount Lemmon || Mount Lemmon Survey || JUN || align=right | 1.4 km || 
|-id=497 bgcolor=#E9E9E9
| 309497 ||  || — || November 12, 2007 || Catalina || CSS || JUN || align=right | 1.5 km || 
|-id=498 bgcolor=#E9E9E9
| 309498 ||  || — || November 8, 2007 || Mount Lemmon || Mount Lemmon Survey || — || align=right | 1.9 km || 
|-id=499 bgcolor=#E9E9E9
| 309499 ||  || — || November 2, 2007 || Kitt Peak || Spacewatch || — || align=right | 1.5 km || 
|-id=500 bgcolor=#E9E9E9
| 309500 ||  || — || November 6, 2007 || Mount Lemmon || Mount Lemmon Survey || JUN || align=right | 1.6 km || 
|}

309501–309600 

|-bgcolor=#E9E9E9
| 309501 ||  || — || November 8, 2007 || Kitt Peak || Spacewatch || ADE || align=right | 2.5 km || 
|-id=502 bgcolor=#d6d6d6
| 309502 ||  || — || November 11, 2007 || Mount Lemmon || Mount Lemmon Survey || CHA || align=right | 2.3 km || 
|-id=503 bgcolor=#fefefe
| 309503 ||  || — || November 8, 2007 || Kitt Peak || Spacewatch || — || align=right | 1.2 km || 
|-id=504 bgcolor=#fefefe
| 309504 ||  || — || November 2, 2007 || Catalina || CSS || — || align=right | 1.4 km || 
|-id=505 bgcolor=#E9E9E9
| 309505 ||  || — || November 9, 2007 || Kitt Peak || Spacewatch || — || align=right | 1.3 km || 
|-id=506 bgcolor=#E9E9E9
| 309506 ||  || — || November 3, 2007 || Mount Lemmon || Mount Lemmon Survey || — || align=right | 3.3 km || 
|-id=507 bgcolor=#E9E9E9
| 309507 ||  || — || November 5, 2007 || Kitt Peak || Spacewatch || — || align=right | 1.2 km || 
|-id=508 bgcolor=#E9E9E9
| 309508 ||  || — || November 14, 2007 || Kitt Peak || Spacewatch || — || align=right | 1.2 km || 
|-id=509 bgcolor=#E9E9E9
| 309509 ||  || — || November 18, 2007 || Socorro || LINEAR || — || align=right | 1.5 km || 
|-id=510 bgcolor=#E9E9E9
| 309510 ||  || — || November 18, 2007 || Mount Lemmon || Mount Lemmon Survey || — || align=right | 1.6 km || 
|-id=511 bgcolor=#E9E9E9
| 309511 ||  || — || November 18, 2007 || Mount Lemmon || Mount Lemmon Survey || JUN || align=right | 1.6 km || 
|-id=512 bgcolor=#E9E9E9
| 309512 ||  || — || November 18, 2007 || Mount Lemmon || Mount Lemmon Survey || DOR || align=right | 3.1 km || 
|-id=513 bgcolor=#E9E9E9
| 309513 ||  || — || November 18, 2007 || Mount Lemmon || Mount Lemmon Survey || — || align=right | 1.5 km || 
|-id=514 bgcolor=#E9E9E9
| 309514 ||  || — || November 18, 2007 || Kitt Peak || Spacewatch || HEN || align=right | 1.3 km || 
|-id=515 bgcolor=#E9E9E9
| 309515 ||  || — || December 3, 2007 || Catalina || CSS || — || align=right | 1.5 km || 
|-id=516 bgcolor=#E9E9E9
| 309516 ||  || — || December 3, 2007 || Kitt Peak || Spacewatch || — || align=right | 1.3 km || 
|-id=517 bgcolor=#E9E9E9
| 309517 ||  || — || December 2, 2007 || Lulin || LUSS || — || align=right | 2.3 km || 
|-id=518 bgcolor=#E9E9E9
| 309518 ||  || — || December 3, 2007 || Catalina || CSS || — || align=right | 2.4 km || 
|-id=519 bgcolor=#E9E9E9
| 309519 ||  || — || December 4, 2007 || Catalina || CSS || — || align=right | 1.6 km || 
|-id=520 bgcolor=#E9E9E9
| 309520 ||  || — || August 22, 2006 || Palomar || NEAT || — || align=right | 2.1 km || 
|-id=521 bgcolor=#E9E9E9
| 309521 ||  || — || March 8, 2005 || Mount Lemmon || Mount Lemmon Survey || — || align=right | 1.2 km || 
|-id=522 bgcolor=#E9E9E9
| 309522 ||  || — || December 11, 2007 || La Sagra || OAM Obs. || — || align=right | 1.4 km || 
|-id=523 bgcolor=#E9E9E9
| 309523 ||  || — || December 13, 2007 || Dauban || Chante-Perdrix Obs. || ADE || align=right | 3.3 km || 
|-id=524 bgcolor=#E9E9E9
| 309524 ||  || — || December 15, 2007 || Wrightwood || J. W. Young || — || align=right | 2.6 km || 
|-id=525 bgcolor=#E9E9E9
| 309525 ||  || — || December 15, 2007 || Catalina || CSS || — || align=right | 2.2 km || 
|-id=526 bgcolor=#E9E9E9
| 309526 ||  || — || April 2, 2005 || Mount Lemmon || Mount Lemmon Survey || HEN || align=right | 1.2 km || 
|-id=527 bgcolor=#E9E9E9
| 309527 ||  || — || December 15, 2007 || Catalina || CSS || — || align=right | 1.3 km || 
|-id=528 bgcolor=#E9E9E9
| 309528 ||  || — || December 13, 2007 || Socorro || LINEAR || — || align=right | 1.9 km || 
|-id=529 bgcolor=#E9E9E9
| 309529 ||  || — || December 13, 2007 || Socorro || LINEAR || HNS || align=right | 1.9 km || 
|-id=530 bgcolor=#E9E9E9
| 309530 ||  || — || December 15, 2007 || Socorro || LINEAR || — || align=right | 1.3 km || 
|-id=531 bgcolor=#E9E9E9
| 309531 ||  || — || December 15, 2007 || Socorro || LINEAR || EUN || align=right | 1.1 km || 
|-id=532 bgcolor=#E9E9E9
| 309532 ||  || — || December 15, 2007 || Catalina || CSS || — || align=right | 1.4 km || 
|-id=533 bgcolor=#E9E9E9
| 309533 ||  || — || December 16, 2007 || Kitt Peak || Spacewatch || AGN || align=right | 1.3 km || 
|-id=534 bgcolor=#E9E9E9
| 309534 ||  || — || December 16, 2007 || Mount Lemmon || Mount Lemmon Survey || MAR || align=right | 1.3 km || 
|-id=535 bgcolor=#E9E9E9
| 309535 ||  || — || December 17, 2007 || Mount Lemmon || Mount Lemmon Survey || WIT || align=right | 1.1 km || 
|-id=536 bgcolor=#E9E9E9
| 309536 ||  || — || December 16, 2007 || Kitt Peak || Spacewatch || MAR || align=right | 1.3 km || 
|-id=537 bgcolor=#E9E9E9
| 309537 ||  || — || December 16, 2007 || Kitt Peak || Spacewatch || HEN || align=right | 1.4 km || 
|-id=538 bgcolor=#E9E9E9
| 309538 ||  || — || September 18, 2006 || Catalina || CSS || HOF || align=right | 2.6 km || 
|-id=539 bgcolor=#E9E9E9
| 309539 ||  || — || December 17, 2007 || Kitt Peak || Spacewatch || — || align=right data-sort-value="0.98" | 980 m || 
|-id=540 bgcolor=#E9E9E9
| 309540 ||  || — || December 17, 2007 || Kitt Peak || Spacewatch || — || align=right | 2.0 km || 
|-id=541 bgcolor=#E9E9E9
| 309541 ||  || — || December 18, 2007 || Kitt Peak || Spacewatch || GEF || align=right | 1.3 km || 
|-id=542 bgcolor=#E9E9E9
| 309542 ||  || — || December 28, 2007 || Kitt Peak || Spacewatch || — || align=right | 1.8 km || 
|-id=543 bgcolor=#E9E9E9
| 309543 ||  || — || December 28, 2007 || Kitt Peak || Spacewatch || — || align=right | 1.2 km || 
|-id=544 bgcolor=#E9E9E9
| 309544 ||  || — || December 30, 2007 || Mount Lemmon || Mount Lemmon Survey || — || align=right | 1.3 km || 
|-id=545 bgcolor=#E9E9E9
| 309545 ||  || — || December 17, 2007 || Kitt Peak || Spacewatch || HEN || align=right | 1.1 km || 
|-id=546 bgcolor=#E9E9E9
| 309546 ||  || — || December 30, 2007 || Mount Lemmon || Mount Lemmon Survey || — || align=right | 1.6 km || 
|-id=547 bgcolor=#E9E9E9
| 309547 ||  || — || December 30, 2007 || Kitt Peak || Spacewatch || — || align=right | 1.9 km || 
|-id=548 bgcolor=#E9E9E9
| 309548 ||  || — || December 30, 2007 || Catalina || CSS || — || align=right | 3.0 km || 
|-id=549 bgcolor=#E9E9E9
| 309549 ||  || — || December 30, 2007 || Mount Lemmon || Mount Lemmon Survey || JUN || align=right | 1.2 km || 
|-id=550 bgcolor=#d6d6d6
| 309550 ||  || — || December 30, 2007 || Mount Lemmon || Mount Lemmon Survey || — || align=right | 3.0 km || 
|-id=551 bgcolor=#E9E9E9
| 309551 ||  || — || December 28, 2007 || Kitt Peak || Spacewatch || — || align=right data-sort-value="0.96" | 960 m || 
|-id=552 bgcolor=#E9E9E9
| 309552 ||  || — || December 31, 2007 || Kitt Peak || Spacewatch || — || align=right | 2.7 km || 
|-id=553 bgcolor=#E9E9E9
| 309553 ||  || — || December 31, 2007 || Mount Lemmon || Mount Lemmon Survey || — || align=right | 2.4 km || 
|-id=554 bgcolor=#E9E9E9
| 309554 ||  || — || December 31, 2007 || Mount Lemmon || Mount Lemmon Survey || — || align=right | 1.5 km || 
|-id=555 bgcolor=#E9E9E9
| 309555 ||  || — || December 30, 2007 || Kitt Peak || Spacewatch || — || align=right | 2.1 km || 
|-id=556 bgcolor=#E9E9E9
| 309556 ||  || — || December 29, 2007 || Mayhill || A. Lowe || JUN || align=right | 4.5 km || 
|-id=557 bgcolor=#E9E9E9
| 309557 ||  || — || December 31, 2007 || Catalina || CSS || — || align=right | 2.1 km || 
|-id=558 bgcolor=#E9E9E9
| 309558 ||  || — || December 17, 2007 || Kitt Peak || Spacewatch || AGN || align=right | 1.4 km || 
|-id=559 bgcolor=#d6d6d6
| 309559 ||  || — || December 17, 2007 || Mount Lemmon || Mount Lemmon Survey || — || align=right | 3.3 km || 
|-id=560 bgcolor=#E9E9E9
| 309560 ||  || — || January 1, 2008 || Kitt Peak || Spacewatch || — || align=right | 1.5 km || 
|-id=561 bgcolor=#E9E9E9
| 309561 ||  || — || January 8, 2008 || Dauban || F. Kugel || MAR || align=right | 1.9 km || 
|-id=562 bgcolor=#E9E9E9
| 309562 ||  || — || January 9, 2008 || Lulin || LUSS || — || align=right | 1.7 km || 
|-id=563 bgcolor=#E9E9E9
| 309563 ||  || — || January 10, 2008 || Mount Lemmon || Mount Lemmon Survey || AGN || align=right | 1.0 km || 
|-id=564 bgcolor=#E9E9E9
| 309564 ||  || — || January 10, 2008 || Mount Lemmon || Mount Lemmon Survey || — || align=right | 1.4 km || 
|-id=565 bgcolor=#d6d6d6
| 309565 ||  || — || January 10, 2008 || Mount Lemmon || Mount Lemmon Survey || — || align=right | 3.2 km || 
|-id=566 bgcolor=#E9E9E9
| 309566 ||  || — || January 14, 2008 || Costitx || OAM Obs. || — || align=right | 1.8 km || 
|-id=567 bgcolor=#E9E9E9
| 309567 ||  || — || January 10, 2008 || Kitt Peak || Spacewatch || HOF || align=right | 2.7 km || 
|-id=568 bgcolor=#E9E9E9
| 309568 ||  || — || January 10, 2008 || Mount Lemmon || Mount Lemmon Survey || RAF || align=right data-sort-value="0.99" | 990 m || 
|-id=569 bgcolor=#E9E9E9
| 309569 ||  || — || January 10, 2008 || Mount Lemmon || Mount Lemmon Survey || — || align=right | 1.4 km || 
|-id=570 bgcolor=#d6d6d6
| 309570 ||  || — || January 10, 2008 || Mount Lemmon || Mount Lemmon Survey || 627 || align=right | 3.2 km || 
|-id=571 bgcolor=#E9E9E9
| 309571 ||  || — || January 11, 2008 || Kitt Peak || Spacewatch || — || align=right | 1.5 km || 
|-id=572 bgcolor=#E9E9E9
| 309572 ||  || — || January 11, 2008 || Kitt Peak || Spacewatch || MRX || align=right | 1.1 km || 
|-id=573 bgcolor=#E9E9E9
| 309573 ||  || — || January 11, 2008 || Kitt Peak || Spacewatch || HEN || align=right | 1.4 km || 
|-id=574 bgcolor=#E9E9E9
| 309574 ||  || — || January 11, 2008 || Kitt Peak || Spacewatch || WIT || align=right | 1.0 km || 
|-id=575 bgcolor=#E9E9E9
| 309575 ||  || — || January 11, 2008 || Kitt Peak || Spacewatch || — || align=right | 2.5 km || 
|-id=576 bgcolor=#E9E9E9
| 309576 ||  || — || January 12, 2008 || Kitt Peak || Spacewatch || HEN || align=right | 1.4 km || 
|-id=577 bgcolor=#E9E9E9
| 309577 ||  || — || January 13, 2008 || Mount Lemmon || Mount Lemmon Survey || NEM || align=right | 3.0 km || 
|-id=578 bgcolor=#E9E9E9
| 309578 ||  || — || January 15, 2008 || Mount Lemmon || Mount Lemmon Survey || HEN || align=right | 1.5 km || 
|-id=579 bgcolor=#E9E9E9
| 309579 ||  || — || January 13, 2008 || Kitt Peak || Spacewatch || HEN || align=right | 1.1 km || 
|-id=580 bgcolor=#E9E9E9
| 309580 ||  || — || January 14, 2008 || Kitt Peak || Spacewatch || PAD || align=right | 2.8 km || 
|-id=581 bgcolor=#E9E9E9
| 309581 ||  || — || December 30, 2007 || Kitt Peak || Spacewatch || XIZ || align=right | 1.7 km || 
|-id=582 bgcolor=#d6d6d6
| 309582 ||  || — || April 19, 2004 || Kitt Peak || Spacewatch || — || align=right | 3.8 km || 
|-id=583 bgcolor=#E9E9E9
| 309583 ||  || — || January 15, 2008 || Anderson Mesa || LONEOS || — || align=right | 1.8 km || 
|-id=584 bgcolor=#E9E9E9
| 309584 ||  || — || January 15, 2008 || Mount Lemmon || Mount Lemmon Survey || WIT || align=right | 1.3 km || 
|-id=585 bgcolor=#E9E9E9
| 309585 ||  || — || January 15, 2008 || Mount Lemmon || Mount Lemmon Survey || — || align=right | 2.8 km || 
|-id=586 bgcolor=#d6d6d6
| 309586 ||  || — || January 15, 2008 || Kitt Peak || Spacewatch || THM || align=right | 2.8 km || 
|-id=587 bgcolor=#E9E9E9
| 309587 ||  || — || January 14, 2008 || Bisei SG Center || BATTeRS || — || align=right | 1.4 km || 
|-id=588 bgcolor=#d6d6d6
| 309588 ||  || — || January 11, 2008 || Kitt Peak || Spacewatch || KOR || align=right | 1.3 km || 
|-id=589 bgcolor=#E9E9E9
| 309589 ||  || — || January 14, 2008 || Kitt Peak || Spacewatch || AGN || align=right | 1.2 km || 
|-id=590 bgcolor=#d6d6d6
| 309590 ||  || — || January 10, 2008 || Kitt Peak || Spacewatch || — || align=right | 2.7 km || 
|-id=591 bgcolor=#E9E9E9
| 309591 ||  || — || January 11, 2008 || Catalina || CSS || — || align=right | 1.4 km || 
|-id=592 bgcolor=#E9E9E9
| 309592 ||  || — || January 11, 2008 || Catalina || CSS || — || align=right | 3.2 km || 
|-id=593 bgcolor=#E9E9E9
| 309593 ||  || — || January 12, 2008 || Catalina || CSS || ADE || align=right | 2.5 km || 
|-id=594 bgcolor=#E9E9E9
| 309594 ||  || — || January 15, 2008 || Mount Lemmon || Mount Lemmon Survey || — || align=right | 2.0 km || 
|-id=595 bgcolor=#E9E9E9
| 309595 ||  || — || January 16, 2008 || Kitt Peak || Spacewatch || — || align=right | 1.9 km || 
|-id=596 bgcolor=#E9E9E9
| 309596 ||  || — || January 16, 2008 || Kitt Peak || Spacewatch || — || align=right | 1.2 km || 
|-id=597 bgcolor=#E9E9E9
| 309597 ||  || — || January 18, 2008 || Kitt Peak || Spacewatch || AGN || align=right | 1.2 km || 
|-id=598 bgcolor=#E9E9E9
| 309598 ||  || — || January 30, 2008 || Catalina || CSS || — || align=right | 1.5 km || 
|-id=599 bgcolor=#E9E9E9
| 309599 ||  || — || January 30, 2008 || Kitt Peak || Spacewatch || — || align=right | 1.6 km || 
|-id=600 bgcolor=#E9E9E9
| 309600 ||  || — || January 30, 2008 || Catalina || CSS || — || align=right | 1.4 km || 
|}

309601–309700 

|-bgcolor=#fefefe
| 309601 ||  || — || January 31, 2008 || Catalina || CSS || — || align=right | 1.1 km || 
|-id=602 bgcolor=#fefefe
| 309602 ||  || — || January 30, 2008 || Catalina || CSS || NYS || align=right data-sort-value="0.81" | 810 m || 
|-id=603 bgcolor=#E9E9E9
| 309603 ||  || — || January 30, 2008 || Kitt Peak || Spacewatch || WIT || align=right | 1.3 km || 
|-id=604 bgcolor=#d6d6d6
| 309604 ||  || — || January 30, 2008 || Mount Lemmon || Mount Lemmon Survey || — || align=right | 3.2 km || 
|-id=605 bgcolor=#E9E9E9
| 309605 ||  || — || January 30, 2008 || Catalina || CSS || — || align=right | 2.3 km || 
|-id=606 bgcolor=#d6d6d6
| 309606 ||  || — || January 30, 2008 || Mount Lemmon || Mount Lemmon Survey || — || align=right | 2.1 km || 
|-id=607 bgcolor=#d6d6d6
| 309607 ||  || — || January 30, 2008 || Mount Lemmon || Mount Lemmon Survey || TEL || align=right | 1.8 km || 
|-id=608 bgcolor=#d6d6d6
| 309608 ||  || — || January 31, 2008 || Mount Lemmon || Mount Lemmon Survey || K-2 || align=right | 1.2 km || 
|-id=609 bgcolor=#E9E9E9
| 309609 ||  || — || January 30, 2008 || Catalina || CSS || GEF || align=right | 1.7 km || 
|-id=610 bgcolor=#E9E9E9
| 309610 ||  || — || January 31, 2008 || Catalina || CSS || JUN || align=right | 1.5 km || 
|-id=611 bgcolor=#d6d6d6
| 309611 ||  || — || March 10, 2003 || Palomar || NEAT || — || align=right | 4.1 km || 
|-id=612 bgcolor=#E9E9E9
| 309612 ||  || — || January 31, 2008 || Catalina || CSS || HNS || align=right | 1.6 km || 
|-id=613 bgcolor=#d6d6d6
| 309613 ||  || — || January 30, 2008 || Mount Lemmon || Mount Lemmon Survey || — || align=right | 2.4 km || 
|-id=614 bgcolor=#E9E9E9
| 309614 ||  || — || February 1, 2008 || Mount Lemmon || Mount Lemmon Survey || — || align=right | 1.7 km || 
|-id=615 bgcolor=#d6d6d6
| 309615 ||  || — || February 2, 2008 || Mount Lemmon || Mount Lemmon Survey || — || align=right | 2.0 km || 
|-id=616 bgcolor=#d6d6d6
| 309616 ||  || — || February 1, 2008 || Kitt Peak || Spacewatch || — || align=right | 3.2 km || 
|-id=617 bgcolor=#E9E9E9
| 309617 ||  || — || February 1, 2008 || Kitt Peak || Spacewatch || PAE || align=right | 3.9 km || 
|-id=618 bgcolor=#d6d6d6
| 309618 ||  || — || February 1, 2008 || Kitt Peak || Spacewatch || — || align=right | 3.0 km || 
|-id=619 bgcolor=#E9E9E9
| 309619 ||  || — || February 1, 2008 || Catalina || CSS || — || align=right | 3.9 km || 
|-id=620 bgcolor=#E9E9E9
| 309620 ||  || — || February 6, 2008 || Catalina || CSS || — || align=right | 2.9 km || 
|-id=621 bgcolor=#fefefe
| 309621 ||  || — || February 7, 2008 || Mount Lemmon || Mount Lemmon Survey || NYS || align=right data-sort-value="0.89" | 890 m || 
|-id=622 bgcolor=#E9E9E9
| 309622 ||  || — || February 5, 2008 || La Sagra || OAM Obs. || JUN || align=right | 1.3 km || 
|-id=623 bgcolor=#E9E9E9
| 309623 ||  || — || February 6, 2008 || Catalina || CSS || — || align=right | 3.9 km || 
|-id=624 bgcolor=#d6d6d6
| 309624 ||  || — || February 7, 2008 || Kitt Peak || Spacewatch || HYG || align=right | 3.8 km || 
|-id=625 bgcolor=#E9E9E9
| 309625 ||  || — || February 7, 2008 || Kitt Peak || Spacewatch || — || align=right | 2.2 km || 
|-id=626 bgcolor=#d6d6d6
| 309626 ||  || — || February 7, 2008 || Mount Lemmon || Mount Lemmon Survey || — || align=right | 3.5 km || 
|-id=627 bgcolor=#d6d6d6
| 309627 ||  || — || February 9, 2008 || Kitt Peak || Spacewatch || KAR || align=right | 1.2 km || 
|-id=628 bgcolor=#d6d6d6
| 309628 ||  || — || February 9, 2008 || Kitt Peak || Spacewatch || — || align=right | 4.1 km || 
|-id=629 bgcolor=#d6d6d6
| 309629 ||  || — || February 9, 2008 || Kitt Peak || Spacewatch || TEL || align=right | 1.8 km || 
|-id=630 bgcolor=#E9E9E9
| 309630 ||  || — || February 7, 2008 || Kitt Peak || Spacewatch || — || align=right | 1.6 km || 
|-id=631 bgcolor=#d6d6d6
| 309631 ||  || — || February 8, 2008 || Kitt Peak || Spacewatch || K-2 || align=right | 1.5 km || 
|-id=632 bgcolor=#E9E9E9
| 309632 ||  || — || February 8, 2008 || Mount Lemmon || Mount Lemmon Survey || — || align=right | 2.6 km || 
|-id=633 bgcolor=#d6d6d6
| 309633 ||  || — || February 9, 2008 || Kitt Peak || Spacewatch || — || align=right | 3.0 km || 
|-id=634 bgcolor=#d6d6d6
| 309634 ||  || — || February 9, 2008 || Kitt Peak || Spacewatch || — || align=right | 2.5 km || 
|-id=635 bgcolor=#E9E9E9
| 309635 ||  || — || February 10, 2008 || Mount Lemmon || Mount Lemmon Survey || MRX || align=right | 1.2 km || 
|-id=636 bgcolor=#d6d6d6
| 309636 ||  || — || February 10, 2008 || Kitt Peak || Spacewatch || — || align=right | 2.6 km || 
|-id=637 bgcolor=#E9E9E9
| 309637 ||  || — || February 11, 2008 || Socorro || LINEAR || NEM || align=right | 2.8 km || 
|-id=638 bgcolor=#E9E9E9
| 309638 ||  || — || February 6, 2008 || Catalina || CSS || — || align=right | 2.8 km || 
|-id=639 bgcolor=#E9E9E9
| 309639 ||  || — || February 9, 2008 || Catalina || CSS || — || align=right | 3.2 km || 
|-id=640 bgcolor=#d6d6d6
| 309640 ||  || — || February 11, 2008 || Mount Lemmon || Mount Lemmon Survey || — || align=right | 5.0 km || 
|-id=641 bgcolor=#d6d6d6
| 309641 ||  || — || February 2, 2008 || Kitt Peak || Spacewatch || — || align=right | 3.2 km || 
|-id=642 bgcolor=#d6d6d6
| 309642 ||  || — || February 2, 2008 || Kitt Peak || Spacewatch || 615 || align=right | 1.6 km || 
|-id=643 bgcolor=#d6d6d6
| 309643 ||  || — || February 2, 2008 || Kitt Peak || Spacewatch || — || align=right | 2.4 km || 
|-id=644 bgcolor=#d6d6d6
| 309644 ||  || — || February 13, 2008 || Mount Lemmon || Mount Lemmon Survey || — || align=right | 3.3 km || 
|-id=645 bgcolor=#d6d6d6
| 309645 ||  || — || February 1, 2008 || Kitt Peak || Spacewatch || — || align=right | 3.2 km || 
|-id=646 bgcolor=#d6d6d6
| 309646 ||  || — || February 7, 2008 || Socorro || LINEAR || — || align=right | 3.5 km || 
|-id=647 bgcolor=#d6d6d6
| 309647 ||  || — || February 10, 2008 || Mount Lemmon || Mount Lemmon Survey || — || align=right | 2.9 km || 
|-id=648 bgcolor=#d6d6d6
| 309648 ||  || — || February 24, 2008 || Mount Lemmon || Mount Lemmon Survey || CHA || align=right | 2.4 km || 
|-id=649 bgcolor=#d6d6d6
| 309649 ||  || — || February 25, 2008 || Kitt Peak || Spacewatch || — || align=right | 3.5 km || 
|-id=650 bgcolor=#d6d6d6
| 309650 ||  || — || February 28, 2008 || Mount Lemmon || Mount Lemmon Survey || — || align=right | 2.2 km || 
|-id=651 bgcolor=#d6d6d6
| 309651 ||  || — || February 28, 2008 || Kitt Peak || Spacewatch || — || align=right | 2.5 km || 
|-id=652 bgcolor=#d6d6d6
| 309652 ||  || — || February 24, 2008 || Kitt Peak || Spacewatch || — || align=right | 2.5 km || 
|-id=653 bgcolor=#d6d6d6
| 309653 ||  || — || February 26, 2008 || Mount Lemmon || Mount Lemmon Survey || — || align=right | 3.2 km || 
|-id=654 bgcolor=#d6d6d6
| 309654 ||  || — || February 26, 2008 || Mount Lemmon || Mount Lemmon Survey || — || align=right | 3.6 km || 
|-id=655 bgcolor=#E9E9E9
| 309655 ||  || — || February 27, 2008 || Kitt Peak || Spacewatch || — || align=right | 2.8 km || 
|-id=656 bgcolor=#d6d6d6
| 309656 ||  || — || February 28, 2008 || Mount Lemmon || Mount Lemmon Survey || — || align=right | 2.4 km || 
|-id=657 bgcolor=#d6d6d6
| 309657 ||  || — || February 29, 2008 || Kitt Peak || Spacewatch || CHA || align=right | 2.2 km || 
|-id=658 bgcolor=#d6d6d6
| 309658 ||  || — || February 29, 2008 || Kitt Peak || Spacewatch || — || align=right | 3.3 km || 
|-id=659 bgcolor=#d6d6d6
| 309659 ||  || — || February 24, 2008 || Kitt Peak || Spacewatch || — || align=right | 2.3 km || 
|-id=660 bgcolor=#d6d6d6
| 309660 ||  || — || February 28, 2008 || Kitt Peak || Spacewatch || — || align=right | 3.1 km || 
|-id=661 bgcolor=#d6d6d6
| 309661 ||  || — || February 28, 2008 || Kitt Peak || Spacewatch || — || align=right | 2.8 km || 
|-id=662 bgcolor=#FFC2E0
| 309662 ||  || — || March 1, 2008 || Socorro || LINEAR || ATEcritical || align=right data-sort-value="0.39" | 390 m || 
|-id=663 bgcolor=#d6d6d6
| 309663 ||  || — || March 1, 2008 || Kitt Peak || Spacewatch || EOS || align=right | 1.9 km || 
|-id=664 bgcolor=#d6d6d6
| 309664 ||  || — || March 3, 2008 || Catalina || CSS || — || align=right | 3.6 km || 
|-id=665 bgcolor=#d6d6d6
| 309665 ||  || — || March 3, 2008 || Catalina || CSS || LUT || align=right | 6.1 km || 
|-id=666 bgcolor=#d6d6d6
| 309666 ||  || — || March 4, 2008 || Kitt Peak || Spacewatch || — || align=right | 4.1 km || 
|-id=667 bgcolor=#d6d6d6
| 309667 ||  || — || March 4, 2008 || Kitt Peak || Spacewatch || HYG || align=right | 3.8 km || 
|-id=668 bgcolor=#d6d6d6
| 309668 ||  || — || March 4, 2008 || Kitt Peak || Spacewatch || — || align=right | 3.6 km || 
|-id=669 bgcolor=#d6d6d6
| 309669 ||  || — || March 4, 2008 || Kitt Peak || Spacewatch || — || align=right | 2.8 km || 
|-id=670 bgcolor=#E9E9E9
| 309670 ||  || — || March 4, 2008 || Mount Lemmon || Mount Lemmon Survey || MRX || align=right | 1.2 km || 
|-id=671 bgcolor=#d6d6d6
| 309671 ||  || — || March 6, 2008 || Kitt Peak || Spacewatch || EOS || align=right | 2.5 km || 
|-id=672 bgcolor=#d6d6d6
| 309672 ||  || — || March 6, 2008 || Mount Lemmon || Mount Lemmon Survey || — || align=right | 4.3 km || 
|-id=673 bgcolor=#d6d6d6
| 309673 ||  || — || March 7, 2008 || Catalina || CSS || — || align=right | 3.6 km || 
|-id=674 bgcolor=#d6d6d6
| 309674 ||  || — || March 11, 2008 || Catalina || CSS || — || align=right | 2.8 km || 
|-id=675 bgcolor=#d6d6d6
| 309675 ||  || — || March 3, 2008 || Purple Mountain || PMO NEO || — || align=right | 4.7 km || 
|-id=676 bgcolor=#d6d6d6
| 309676 ||  || — || March 6, 2008 || Mount Lemmon || Mount Lemmon Survey || — || align=right | 3.6 km || 
|-id=677 bgcolor=#d6d6d6
| 309677 ||  || — || March 5, 2008 || Catalina || CSS || LIX || align=right | 5.2 km || 
|-id=678 bgcolor=#d6d6d6
| 309678 ||  || — || March 5, 2008 || Mount Lemmon || Mount Lemmon Survey || THM || align=right | 2.8 km || 
|-id=679 bgcolor=#d6d6d6
| 309679 ||  || — || March 7, 2008 || Mount Lemmon || Mount Lemmon Survey || — || align=right | 3.1 km || 
|-id=680 bgcolor=#E9E9E9
| 309680 ||  || — || March 7, 2008 || Mount Lemmon || Mount Lemmon Survey || — || align=right | 2.6 km || 
|-id=681 bgcolor=#d6d6d6
| 309681 ||  || — || March 8, 2008 || Kitt Peak || Spacewatch || — || align=right | 5.2 km || 
|-id=682 bgcolor=#fefefe
| 309682 ||  || — || March 11, 2008 || Kitt Peak || Spacewatch || NYS || align=right data-sort-value="0.81" | 810 m || 
|-id=683 bgcolor=#E9E9E9
| 309683 ||  || — || March 1, 2008 || Kitt Peak || Spacewatch || — || align=right | 1.0 km || 
|-id=684 bgcolor=#d6d6d6
| 309684 ||  || — || March 2, 2008 || Kitt Peak || Spacewatch || — || align=right | 3.4 km || 
|-id=685 bgcolor=#d6d6d6
| 309685 ||  || — || March 11, 2008 || Mount Lemmon || Mount Lemmon Survey || — || align=right | 4.3 km || 
|-id=686 bgcolor=#d6d6d6
| 309686 ||  || — || March 8, 2008 || Mount Lemmon || Mount Lemmon Survey || — || align=right | 2.8 km || 
|-id=687 bgcolor=#d6d6d6
| 309687 ||  || — || March 13, 2008 || Socorro || LINEAR || — || align=right | 3.3 km || 
|-id=688 bgcolor=#d6d6d6
| 309688 ||  || — || March 25, 2008 || Kitt Peak || Spacewatch || — || align=right | 2.8 km || 
|-id=689 bgcolor=#d6d6d6
| 309689 ||  || — || March 25, 2008 || Kitt Peak || Spacewatch || — || align=right | 2.5 km || 
|-id=690 bgcolor=#d6d6d6
| 309690 ||  || — || March 26, 2008 || Mount Lemmon || Mount Lemmon Survey || — || align=right | 3.4 km || 
|-id=691 bgcolor=#d6d6d6
| 309691 ||  || — || March 26, 2008 || Kitt Peak || Spacewatch || — || align=right | 4.4 km || 
|-id=692 bgcolor=#d6d6d6
| 309692 ||  || — || March 27, 2008 || Mount Lemmon || Mount Lemmon Survey || — || align=right | 3.3 km || 
|-id=693 bgcolor=#d6d6d6
| 309693 ||  || — || March 28, 2008 || Mount Lemmon || Mount Lemmon Survey || 7:4 || align=right | 4.5 km || 
|-id=694 bgcolor=#d6d6d6
| 309694 ||  || — || March 28, 2008 || Mount Lemmon || Mount Lemmon Survey || — || align=right | 3.7 km || 
|-id=695 bgcolor=#d6d6d6
| 309695 ||  || — || March 28, 2008 || Mount Lemmon || Mount Lemmon Survey || THM || align=right | 2.7 km || 
|-id=696 bgcolor=#d6d6d6
| 309696 ||  || — || March 28, 2008 || Kitt Peak || Spacewatch || 7:4 || align=right | 4.1 km || 
|-id=697 bgcolor=#d6d6d6
| 309697 ||  || — || March 27, 2008 || Mount Lemmon || Mount Lemmon Survey || — || align=right | 2.5 km || 
|-id=698 bgcolor=#d6d6d6
| 309698 ||  || — || March 28, 2008 || Mount Lemmon || Mount Lemmon Survey || — || align=right | 2.4 km || 
|-id=699 bgcolor=#d6d6d6
| 309699 ||  || — || March 29, 2008 || Mount Lemmon || Mount Lemmon Survey || THM || align=right | 2.4 km || 
|-id=700 bgcolor=#d6d6d6
| 309700 ||  || — || March 30, 2008 || Catalina || CSS || — || align=right | 4.2 km || 
|}

309701–309800 

|-bgcolor=#d6d6d6
| 309701 ||  || — || March 30, 2008 || Kitt Peak || Spacewatch || — || align=right | 3.5 km || 
|-id=702 bgcolor=#d6d6d6
| 309702 ||  || — || March 31, 2008 || Mount Lemmon || Mount Lemmon Survey || HYG || align=right | 2.7 km || 
|-id=703 bgcolor=#d6d6d6
| 309703 ||  || — || March 31, 2008 || Mount Lemmon || Mount Lemmon Survey || — || align=right | 2.4 km || 
|-id=704 bgcolor=#d6d6d6
| 309704 Baruffetti ||  ||  || March 29, 2008 || San Marcello || L. Tesi, G. Fagioli || — || align=right | 4.3 km || 
|-id=705 bgcolor=#d6d6d6
| 309705 ||  || — || March 31, 2008 || Mount Lemmon || Mount Lemmon Survey || EOS || align=right | 2.5 km || 
|-id=706 bgcolor=#d6d6d6
| 309706 Ávila || 2008 GP ||  || April 3, 2008 || La Cañada || J. Lacruz || — || align=right | 7.5 km || 
|-id=707 bgcolor=#C2FFFF
| 309707 ||  || — || April 1, 2008 || Mount Lemmon || Mount Lemmon Survey || L4 || align=right | 20 km || 
|-id=708 bgcolor=#d6d6d6
| 309708 ||  || — || April 5, 2008 || Mount Lemmon || Mount Lemmon Survey || THM || align=right | 2.6 km || 
|-id=709 bgcolor=#d6d6d6
| 309709 ||  || — || April 7, 2008 || Great Shefford || P. Birtwhistle || — || align=right | 4.1 km || 
|-id=710 bgcolor=#d6d6d6
| 309710 ||  || — || April 3, 2008 || Mount Lemmon || Mount Lemmon Survey || EOS || align=right | 1.9 km || 
|-id=711 bgcolor=#d6d6d6
| 309711 ||  || — || April 3, 2008 || Mount Lemmon || Mount Lemmon Survey || EOS || align=right | 2.2 km || 
|-id=712 bgcolor=#d6d6d6
| 309712 ||  || — || April 5, 2008 || Mount Lemmon || Mount Lemmon Survey || — || align=right | 5.4 km || 
|-id=713 bgcolor=#d6d6d6
| 309713 ||  || — || April 6, 2008 || Kitt Peak || Spacewatch || VER || align=right | 2.9 km || 
|-id=714 bgcolor=#d6d6d6
| 309714 ||  || — || April 13, 2008 || Dauban || F. Kugel || — || align=right | 5.4 km || 
|-id=715 bgcolor=#d6d6d6
| 309715 ||  || — || April 9, 2008 || Mount Lemmon || Mount Lemmon Survey || HYG || align=right | 3.1 km || 
|-id=716 bgcolor=#d6d6d6
| 309716 ||  || — || April 11, 2008 || Kitt Peak || Spacewatch || — || align=right | 3.9 km || 
|-id=717 bgcolor=#d6d6d6
| 309717 ||  || — || April 11, 2008 || Catalina || CSS || — || align=right | 3.5 km || 
|-id=718 bgcolor=#d6d6d6
| 309718 ||  || — || April 13, 2008 || Kitt Peak || Spacewatch || — || align=right | 2.9 km || 
|-id=719 bgcolor=#E9E9E9
| 309719 ||  || — || April 3, 2008 || Kitt Peak || Spacewatch || — || align=right | 2.3 km || 
|-id=720 bgcolor=#d6d6d6
| 309720 ||  || — || April 3, 2008 || Kitt Peak || Spacewatch || HYG || align=right | 3.5 km || 
|-id=721 bgcolor=#d6d6d6
| 309721 ||  || — || April 11, 2008 || Mount Lemmon || Mount Lemmon Survey || — || align=right | 3.2 km || 
|-id=722 bgcolor=#d6d6d6
| 309722 ||  || — || April 11, 2008 || Socorro || LINEAR || TIR || align=right | 3.9 km || 
|-id=723 bgcolor=#d6d6d6
| 309723 ||  || — || April 24, 2008 || Kitt Peak || Spacewatch || — || align=right | 2.7 km || 
|-id=724 bgcolor=#d6d6d6
| 309724 ||  || — || April 26, 2008 || Kitt Peak || Spacewatch || — || align=right | 3.5 km || 
|-id=725 bgcolor=#d6d6d6
| 309725 ||  || — || April 29, 2008 || Mount Lemmon || Mount Lemmon Survey || — || align=right | 3.2 km || 
|-id=726 bgcolor=#d6d6d6
| 309726 ||  || — || April 30, 2008 || Mount Lemmon || Mount Lemmon Survey || — || align=right | 3.8 km || 
|-id=727 bgcolor=#d6d6d6
| 309727 ||  || — || April 30, 2008 || Mount Lemmon || Mount Lemmon Survey || — || align=right | 3.3 km || 
|-id=728 bgcolor=#FFC2E0
| 309728 ||  || — || May 1, 2008 || Catalina || CSS || AMO +1km || align=right data-sort-value="0.89" | 890 m || 
|-id=729 bgcolor=#E9E9E9
| 309729 ||  || — || May 7, 2008 || Kitt Peak || Spacewatch || — || align=right | 1.4 km || 
|-id=730 bgcolor=#d6d6d6
| 309730 ||  || — || May 30, 2008 || Kitt Peak || Spacewatch || — || align=right | 2.4 km || 
|-id=731 bgcolor=#d6d6d6
| 309731 ||  || — || June 10, 2008 || Kitt Peak || Spacewatch || — || align=right | 5.5 km || 
|-id=732 bgcolor=#d6d6d6
| 309732 ||  || — || August 30, 2008 || Charleston || ARO || — || align=right | 3.8 km || 
|-id=733 bgcolor=#C2FFFF
| 309733 ||  || — || September 2, 2008 || Kitt Peak || Spacewatch || L4 || align=right | 8.7 km || 
|-id=734 bgcolor=#E9E9E9
| 309734 ||  || — || September 1, 2008 || Siding Spring || SSS || — || align=right | 1.8 km || 
|-id=735 bgcolor=#C2FFFF
| 309735 ||  || — || September 3, 2008 || Kitt Peak || Spacewatch || L4 || align=right | 9.9 km || 
|-id=736 bgcolor=#E9E9E9
| 309736 ||  || — || September 26, 2008 || Kitt Peak || Spacewatch || — || align=right | 1.2 km || 
|-id=737 bgcolor=#C7FF8F
| 309737 ||  || — || September 29, 2008 || Kitt Peak || Spacewatch || centaurcritical || align=right | 18 km || 
|-id=738 bgcolor=#fefefe
| 309738 ||  || — || October 1, 2008 || Catalina || CSS || — || align=right data-sort-value="0.76" | 760 m || 
|-id=739 bgcolor=#E9E9E9
| 309739 ||  || — || October 5, 2008 || La Sagra || OAM Obs. || — || align=right | 1.4 km || 
|-id=740 bgcolor=#fefefe
| 309740 ||  || — || October 22, 2008 || Kitt Peak || Spacewatch || H || align=right data-sort-value="0.71" | 710 m || 
|-id=741 bgcolor=#C7FF8F
| 309741 ||  || — || October 22, 2008 || Kitt Peak || Spacewatch || centaurcritical || align=right | 32 km || 
|-id=742 bgcolor=#fefefe
| 309742 ||  || — || October 22, 2008 || Kitt Peak || Spacewatch || — || align=right | 3.3 km || 
|-id=743 bgcolor=#fefefe
| 309743 ||  || — || October 24, 2008 || Kitt Peak || Spacewatch || FLO || align=right data-sort-value="0.62" | 620 m || 
|-id=744 bgcolor=#fefefe
| 309744 ||  || — || October 31, 2008 || Mount Lemmon || Mount Lemmon Survey || H || align=right | 1.0 km || 
|-id=745 bgcolor=#fefefe
| 309745 ||  || — || October 28, 2008 || Kitt Peak || Spacewatch || NYS || align=right data-sort-value="0.69" | 690 m || 
|-id=746 bgcolor=#fefefe
| 309746 ||  || — || October 29, 2008 || Kitt Peak || Spacewatch || FLO || align=right data-sort-value="0.84" | 840 m || 
|-id=747 bgcolor=#fefefe
| 309747 ||  || — || October 30, 2008 || Catalina || CSS || — || align=right data-sort-value="0.89" | 890 m || 
|-id=748 bgcolor=#fefefe
| 309748 ||  || — || October 30, 2008 || Kitt Peak || Spacewatch || — || align=right data-sort-value="0.78" | 780 m || 
|-id=749 bgcolor=#fefefe
| 309749 ||  || — || October 22, 2008 || Kitt Peak || Spacewatch || — || align=right data-sort-value="0.98" | 980 m || 
|-id=750 bgcolor=#E9E9E9
| 309750 ||  || — || November 2, 2008 || Socorro || LINEAR || MAR || align=right | 1.6 km || 
|-id=751 bgcolor=#fefefe
| 309751 ||  || — || November 6, 2008 || Socorro || LINEAR || H || align=right data-sort-value="0.88" | 880 m || 
|-id=752 bgcolor=#E9E9E9
| 309752 ||  || — || November 1, 2008 || Catalina || CSS || EUN || align=right | 3.1 km || 
|-id=753 bgcolor=#fefefe
| 309753 ||  || — || November 2, 2008 || Kitt Peak || Spacewatch || — || align=right data-sort-value="0.63" | 630 m || 
|-id=754 bgcolor=#fefefe
| 309754 ||  || — || August 11, 2004 || Socorro || LINEAR || — || align=right data-sort-value="0.85" | 850 m || 
|-id=755 bgcolor=#d6d6d6
| 309755 ||  || — || August 12, 1997 || Kitt Peak || Spacewatch || — || align=right | 2.9 km || 
|-id=756 bgcolor=#E9E9E9
| 309756 ||  || — || November 29, 2008 || Bergisch Gladbac || W. Bickel || — || align=right | 4.2 km || 
|-id=757 bgcolor=#fefefe
| 309757 ||  || — || November 23, 2008 || Mount Lemmon || Mount Lemmon Survey || — || align=right data-sort-value="0.77" | 770 m || 
|-id=758 bgcolor=#fefefe
| 309758 ||  || — || December 4, 2008 || Mount Lemmon || Mount Lemmon Survey || — || align=right data-sort-value="0.74" | 740 m || 
|-id=759 bgcolor=#E9E9E9
| 309759 ||  || — || December 4, 2008 || Mount Lemmon || Mount Lemmon Survey || — || align=right | 1.4 km || 
|-id=760 bgcolor=#d6d6d6
| 309760 ||  || — || December 3, 2008 || Mount Lemmon || Mount Lemmon Survey || — || align=right | 4.1 km || 
|-id=761 bgcolor=#fefefe
| 309761 ||  || — || December 22, 2008 || Dauban || F. Kugel || V || align=right data-sort-value="0.74" | 740 m || 
|-id=762 bgcolor=#fefefe
| 309762 ||  || — || December 22, 2008 || Vallemare Borbon || V. S. Casulli || FLO || align=right data-sort-value="0.74" | 740 m || 
|-id=763 bgcolor=#fefefe
| 309763 ||  || — || December 21, 2008 || Catalina || CSS || — || align=right | 1.1 km || 
|-id=764 bgcolor=#fefefe
| 309764 ||  || — || December 22, 2008 || Kitt Peak || Spacewatch || — || align=right data-sort-value="0.76" | 760 m || 
|-id=765 bgcolor=#fefefe
| 309765 ||  || — || December 29, 2008 || Mount Lemmon || Mount Lemmon Survey || V || align=right data-sort-value="0.72" | 720 m || 
|-id=766 bgcolor=#fefefe
| 309766 ||  || — || December 29, 2008 || Mount Lemmon || Mount Lemmon Survey || NYS || align=right data-sort-value="0.82" | 820 m || 
|-id=767 bgcolor=#fefefe
| 309767 ||  || — || December 30, 2008 || Mount Lemmon || Mount Lemmon Survey || — || align=right data-sort-value="0.64" | 640 m || 
|-id=768 bgcolor=#fefefe
| 309768 ||  || — || December 30, 2008 || Mount Lemmon || Mount Lemmon Survey || NYS || align=right data-sort-value="0.66" | 660 m || 
|-id=769 bgcolor=#fefefe
| 309769 ||  || — || December 30, 2008 || Mount Lemmon || Mount Lemmon Survey || — || align=right | 1.2 km || 
|-id=770 bgcolor=#fefefe
| 309770 ||  || — || December 30, 2008 || Mount Lemmon || Mount Lemmon Survey || NYS || align=right data-sort-value="0.74" | 740 m || 
|-id=771 bgcolor=#fefefe
| 309771 ||  || — || December 30, 2008 || Kitt Peak || Spacewatch || — || align=right | 1.2 km || 
|-id=772 bgcolor=#fefefe
| 309772 ||  || — || December 29, 2008 || Mount Lemmon || Mount Lemmon Survey || — || align=right | 2.2 km || 
|-id=773 bgcolor=#fefefe
| 309773 ||  || — || December 29, 2008 || Kitt Peak || Spacewatch || — || align=right | 1.2 km || 
|-id=774 bgcolor=#fefefe
| 309774 ||  || — || December 29, 2008 || Kitt Peak || Spacewatch || V || align=right data-sort-value="0.87" | 870 m || 
|-id=775 bgcolor=#fefefe
| 309775 ||  || — || December 30, 2008 || Kitt Peak || Spacewatch || — || align=right data-sort-value="0.90" | 900 m || 
|-id=776 bgcolor=#fefefe
| 309776 ||  || — || December 30, 2008 || Kitt Peak || Spacewatch || V || align=right data-sort-value="0.96" | 960 m || 
|-id=777 bgcolor=#E9E9E9
| 309777 ||  || — || December 29, 2008 || Kitt Peak || Spacewatch || — || align=right | 1.9 km || 
|-id=778 bgcolor=#fefefe
| 309778 ||  || — || November 11, 2004 || Kitt Peak || Spacewatch || — || align=right data-sort-value="0.95" | 950 m || 
|-id=779 bgcolor=#fefefe
| 309779 ||  || — || December 30, 2008 || Mount Lemmon || Mount Lemmon Survey || — || align=right | 1.0 km || 
|-id=780 bgcolor=#fefefe
| 309780 ||  || — || December 30, 2008 || Mount Lemmon || Mount Lemmon Survey || — || align=right data-sort-value="0.78" | 780 m || 
|-id=781 bgcolor=#fefefe
| 309781 ||  || — || December 21, 2008 || Kitt Peak || Spacewatch || — || align=right data-sort-value="0.60" | 600 m || 
|-id=782 bgcolor=#fefefe
| 309782 ||  || — || December 22, 2008 || Mount Lemmon || Mount Lemmon Survey || — || align=right data-sort-value="0.69" | 690 m || 
|-id=783 bgcolor=#fefefe
| 309783 ||  || — || December 31, 2008 || Mount Lemmon || Mount Lemmon Survey || NYS || align=right data-sort-value="0.88" | 880 m || 
|-id=784 bgcolor=#fefefe
| 309784 ||  || — || December 29, 2008 || Mount Lemmon || Mount Lemmon Survey || NYS || align=right data-sort-value="0.61" | 610 m || 
|-id=785 bgcolor=#fefefe
| 309785 ||  || — || December 30, 2008 || Kitt Peak || Spacewatch || NYS || align=right data-sort-value="0.77" | 770 m || 
|-id=786 bgcolor=#E9E9E9
| 309786 ||  || — || December 30, 2008 || Mount Lemmon || Mount Lemmon Survey || RAF || align=right | 1.1 km || 
|-id=787 bgcolor=#fefefe
| 309787 ||  || — || December 22, 2008 || Mount Lemmon || Mount Lemmon Survey || — || align=right data-sort-value="0.68" | 680 m || 
|-id=788 bgcolor=#fefefe
| 309788 ||  || — || January 2, 2009 || Mount Lemmon || Mount Lemmon Survey || NYS || align=right data-sort-value="0.70" | 700 m || 
|-id=789 bgcolor=#fefefe
| 309789 ||  || — || January 3, 2009 || Kitt Peak || Spacewatch || MAS || align=right data-sort-value="0.89" | 890 m || 
|-id=790 bgcolor=#fefefe
| 309790 ||  || — || April 25, 2003 || Kitt Peak || Spacewatch || — || align=right data-sort-value="0.94" | 940 m || 
|-id=791 bgcolor=#fefefe
| 309791 ||  || — || January 15, 2009 || Kitt Peak || Spacewatch || NYS || align=right data-sort-value="0.59" | 590 m || 
|-id=792 bgcolor=#fefefe
| 309792 ||  || — || January 15, 2009 || Kitt Peak || Spacewatch || — || align=right data-sort-value="0.70" | 700 m || 
|-id=793 bgcolor=#fefefe
| 309793 ||  || — || January 1, 2009 || Kitt Peak || Spacewatch || FLO || align=right data-sort-value="0.72" | 720 m || 
|-id=794 bgcolor=#fefefe
| 309794 ||  || — || January 2, 2009 || Mount Lemmon || Mount Lemmon Survey || — || align=right | 1.0 km || 
|-id=795 bgcolor=#fefefe
| 309795 ||  || — || January 16, 2009 || Kitt Peak || Spacewatch || MAS || align=right data-sort-value="0.94" | 940 m || 
|-id=796 bgcolor=#fefefe
| 309796 ||  || — || January 16, 2009 || Kitt Peak || Spacewatch || NYS || align=right data-sort-value="0.68" | 680 m || 
|-id=797 bgcolor=#fefefe
| 309797 ||  || — || January 16, 2009 || Kitt Peak || Spacewatch || MAS || align=right | 1.0 km || 
|-id=798 bgcolor=#fefefe
| 309798 ||  || — || January 16, 2009 || Kitt Peak || Spacewatch || MAS || align=right | 1.1 km || 
|-id=799 bgcolor=#fefefe
| 309799 ||  || — || January 16, 2009 || Kitt Peak || Spacewatch || MAS || align=right data-sort-value="0.86" | 860 m || 
|-id=800 bgcolor=#fefefe
| 309800 ||  || — || January 16, 2009 || Kitt Peak || Spacewatch || MAS || align=right data-sort-value="0.88" | 880 m || 
|}

309801–309900 

|-bgcolor=#fefefe
| 309801 ||  || — || January 16, 2009 || Kitt Peak || Spacewatch || V || align=right data-sort-value="0.87" | 870 m || 
|-id=802 bgcolor=#fefefe
| 309802 ||  || — || January 20, 2009 || Kitt Peak || Spacewatch || V || align=right data-sort-value="0.84" | 840 m || 
|-id=803 bgcolor=#fefefe
| 309803 ||  || — || January 25, 2009 || Catalina || CSS || — || align=right data-sort-value="0.93" | 930 m || 
|-id=804 bgcolor=#fefefe
| 309804 ||  || — || January 25, 2009 || Socorro || LINEAR || FLO || align=right data-sort-value="0.93" | 930 m || 
|-id=805 bgcolor=#fefefe
| 309805 ||  || — || January 30, 2009 || Dauban || F. Kugel || NYS || align=right data-sort-value="0.66" | 660 m || 
|-id=806 bgcolor=#fefefe
| 309806 ||  || — || January 28, 2009 || Catalina || CSS || — || align=right | 1.00 km || 
|-id=807 bgcolor=#fefefe
| 309807 ||  || — || January 25, 2009 || Kitt Peak || Spacewatch || NYS || align=right | 1.9 km || 
|-id=808 bgcolor=#fefefe
| 309808 ||  || — || January 25, 2009 || Kitt Peak || Spacewatch || — || align=right data-sort-value="0.75" | 750 m || 
|-id=809 bgcolor=#fefefe
| 309809 ||  || — || January 25, 2009 || Kitt Peak || Spacewatch || — || align=right data-sort-value="0.84" | 840 m || 
|-id=810 bgcolor=#fefefe
| 309810 ||  || — || January 25, 2009 || Kitt Peak || Spacewatch || V || align=right data-sort-value="0.70" | 700 m || 
|-id=811 bgcolor=#fefefe
| 309811 ||  || — || January 25, 2009 || Kitt Peak || Spacewatch || FLO || align=right data-sort-value="0.71" | 710 m || 
|-id=812 bgcolor=#fefefe
| 309812 ||  || — || January 25, 2009 || Kitt Peak || Spacewatch || FLO || align=right data-sort-value="0.64" | 640 m || 
|-id=813 bgcolor=#fefefe
| 309813 ||  || — || January 24, 2009 || Purple Mountain || PMO NEO || — || align=right | 1.0 km || 
|-id=814 bgcolor=#fefefe
| 309814 ||  || — || January 26, 2009 || Mount Lemmon || Mount Lemmon Survey || — || align=right data-sort-value="0.84" | 840 m || 
|-id=815 bgcolor=#fefefe
| 309815 ||  || — || January 26, 2009 || Mount Lemmon || Mount Lemmon Survey || — || align=right data-sort-value="0.78" | 780 m || 
|-id=816 bgcolor=#fefefe
| 309816 ||  || — || January 25, 2009 || Kitt Peak || Spacewatch || — || align=right data-sort-value="0.87" | 870 m || 
|-id=817 bgcolor=#fefefe
| 309817 ||  || — || January 25, 2009 || Kitt Peak || Spacewatch || — || align=right data-sort-value="0.78" | 780 m || 
|-id=818 bgcolor=#E9E9E9
| 309818 ||  || — || January 29, 2009 || Mount Lemmon || Mount Lemmon Survey || — || align=right | 1.0 km || 
|-id=819 bgcolor=#fefefe
| 309819 ||  || — || January 30, 2009 || Kitt Peak || Spacewatch || — || align=right data-sort-value="0.90" | 900 m || 
|-id=820 bgcolor=#E9E9E9
| 309820 ||  || — || January 31, 2009 || Mount Lemmon || Mount Lemmon Survey || — || align=right | 1.0 km || 
|-id=821 bgcolor=#fefefe
| 309821 ||  || — || January 29, 2009 || Kitt Peak || Spacewatch || — || align=right | 1.1 km || 
|-id=822 bgcolor=#E9E9E9
| 309822 ||  || — || January 29, 2009 || Kitt Peak || Spacewatch || KRM || align=right | 2.4 km || 
|-id=823 bgcolor=#fefefe
| 309823 ||  || — || January 30, 2009 || Kitt Peak || Spacewatch || NYS || align=right data-sort-value="0.74" | 740 m || 
|-id=824 bgcolor=#fefefe
| 309824 ||  || — || January 30, 2009 || Mount Lemmon || Mount Lemmon Survey || — || align=right data-sort-value="0.62" | 620 m || 
|-id=825 bgcolor=#fefefe
| 309825 ||  || — || January 31, 2009 || Kitt Peak || Spacewatch || NYS || align=right data-sort-value="0.81" | 810 m || 
|-id=826 bgcolor=#fefefe
| 309826 ||  || — || January 31, 2009 || Kitt Peak || Spacewatch || MAS || align=right data-sort-value="0.82" | 820 m || 
|-id=827 bgcolor=#E9E9E9
| 309827 ||  || — || January 31, 2009 || Kitt Peak || Spacewatch || — || align=right | 1.7 km || 
|-id=828 bgcolor=#fefefe
| 309828 ||  || — || January 31, 2009 || Kitt Peak || Spacewatch || NYS || align=right data-sort-value="0.70" | 700 m || 
|-id=829 bgcolor=#fefefe
| 309829 ||  || — || January 31, 2009 || Kitt Peak || Spacewatch || — || align=right data-sort-value="0.87" | 870 m || 
|-id=830 bgcolor=#fefefe
| 309830 ||  || — || January 19, 2009 || Mount Lemmon || Mount Lemmon Survey || NYS || align=right data-sort-value="0.88" | 880 m || 
|-id=831 bgcolor=#E9E9E9
| 309831 ||  || — || January 25, 2009 || Kitt Peak || Spacewatch || — || align=right data-sort-value="0.95" | 950 m || 
|-id=832 bgcolor=#fefefe
| 309832 ||  || — || January 30, 2009 || Mount Lemmon || Mount Lemmon Survey || — || align=right | 1.3 km || 
|-id=833 bgcolor=#fefefe
| 309833 ||  || — || January 17, 2009 || Kitt Peak || Spacewatch || — || align=right data-sort-value="0.67" | 670 m || 
|-id=834 bgcolor=#fefefe
| 309834 ||  || — || January 18, 2009 || Socorro || LINEAR || FLO || align=right data-sort-value="0.64" | 640 m || 
|-id=835 bgcolor=#E9E9E9
| 309835 ||  || — || January 31, 2009 || Mount Lemmon || Mount Lemmon Survey || WIT || align=right | 1.3 km || 
|-id=836 bgcolor=#fefefe
| 309836 ||  || — || April 2, 2006 || Kitt Peak || Spacewatch || — || align=right data-sort-value="0.68" | 680 m || 
|-id=837 bgcolor=#fefefe
| 309837 ||  || — || February 1, 2009 || Mount Lemmon || Mount Lemmon Survey || FLO || align=right data-sort-value="0.75" | 750 m || 
|-id=838 bgcolor=#fefefe
| 309838 ||  || — || February 1, 2009 || Kitt Peak || Spacewatch || — || align=right data-sort-value="0.64" | 640 m || 
|-id=839 bgcolor=#fefefe
| 309839 ||  || — || February 1, 2009 || Kitt Peak || Spacewatch || MAS || align=right data-sort-value="0.87" | 870 m || 
|-id=840 bgcolor=#fefefe
| 309840 ||  || — || February 1, 2009 || Kitt Peak || Spacewatch || V || align=right data-sort-value="0.81" | 810 m || 
|-id=841 bgcolor=#fefefe
| 309841 ||  || — || February 1, 2009 || Kitt Peak || Spacewatch || MAS || align=right data-sort-value="0.57" | 570 m || 
|-id=842 bgcolor=#fefefe
| 309842 ||  || — || February 15, 2009 || Dauban || F. Kugel || — || align=right | 1.0 km || 
|-id=843 bgcolor=#fefefe
| 309843 ||  || — || February 14, 2009 || Dauban || F. Kugel || — || align=right | 1.1 km || 
|-id=844 bgcolor=#fefefe
| 309844 ||  || — || February 14, 2009 || Kitt Peak || Spacewatch || NYS || align=right data-sort-value="0.84" | 840 m || 
|-id=845 bgcolor=#E9E9E9
| 309845 ||  || — || February 14, 2009 || Kitt Peak || Spacewatch || NEM || align=right | 2.5 km || 
|-id=846 bgcolor=#fefefe
| 309846 ||  || — || February 14, 2009 || La Sagra || OAM Obs. || NYS || align=right data-sort-value="0.91" | 910 m || 
|-id=847 bgcolor=#E9E9E9
| 309847 ||  || — || February 4, 2009 || Kitt Peak || Spacewatch || — || align=right | 1.4 km || 
|-id=848 bgcolor=#fefefe
| 309848 ||  || — || February 17, 2009 || Socorro || LINEAR || — || align=right | 2.5 km || 
|-id=849 bgcolor=#fefefe
| 309849 ||  || — || February 20, 2009 || Cordell-Lorenz || D. T. Durig || V || align=right | 1.1 km || 
|-id=850 bgcolor=#fefefe
| 309850 ||  || — || February 17, 2009 || Kitt Peak || Spacewatch || V || align=right data-sort-value="0.70" | 700 m || 
|-id=851 bgcolor=#fefefe
| 309851 ||  || — || February 19, 2009 || La Sagra || OAM Obs. || MAS || align=right | 1.1 km || 
|-id=852 bgcolor=#fefefe
| 309852 ||  || — || February 20, 2009 || Kitt Peak || Spacewatch || — || align=right data-sort-value="0.99" | 990 m || 
|-id=853 bgcolor=#fefefe
| 309853 ||  || — || February 20, 2009 || Kitt Peak || Spacewatch || MAS || align=right data-sort-value="0.71" | 710 m || 
|-id=854 bgcolor=#fefefe
| 309854 ||  || — || February 20, 2009 || Kitt Peak || Spacewatch || NYS || align=right data-sort-value="0.93" | 930 m || 
|-id=855 bgcolor=#fefefe
| 309855 ||  || — || January 20, 2009 || Kitt Peak || Spacewatch || NYS || align=right data-sort-value="0.56" | 560 m || 
|-id=856 bgcolor=#fefefe
| 309856 ||  || — || February 16, 2009 || La Sagra || OAM Obs. || MAS || align=right data-sort-value="0.76" | 760 m || 
|-id=857 bgcolor=#fefefe
| 309857 ||  || — || February 18, 2009 || La Sagra || OAM Obs. || FLO || align=right data-sort-value="0.68" | 680 m || 
|-id=858 bgcolor=#fefefe
| 309858 ||  || — || February 28, 2009 || Socorro || LINEAR || FLO || align=right data-sort-value="0.83" | 830 m || 
|-id=859 bgcolor=#fefefe
| 309859 ||  || — || February 22, 2009 || Kitt Peak || Spacewatch || — || align=right | 1.0 km || 
|-id=860 bgcolor=#E9E9E9
| 309860 ||  || — || February 22, 2009 || Kitt Peak || Spacewatch || — || align=right | 1.00 km || 
|-id=861 bgcolor=#fefefe
| 309861 ||  || — || February 22, 2009 || Kitt Peak || Spacewatch || NYS || align=right data-sort-value="0.65" | 650 m || 
|-id=862 bgcolor=#E9E9E9
| 309862 ||  || — || February 22, 2009 || Kitt Peak || Spacewatch || — || align=right | 2.4 km || 
|-id=863 bgcolor=#E9E9E9
| 309863 ||  || — || February 24, 2009 || Mount Lemmon || Mount Lemmon Survey || — || align=right | 1.5 km || 
|-id=864 bgcolor=#E9E9E9
| 309864 ||  || — || February 22, 2009 || Mount Lemmon || Mount Lemmon Survey || — || align=right | 1.1 km || 
|-id=865 bgcolor=#E9E9E9
| 309865 ||  || — || February 24, 2009 || Mount Lemmon || Mount Lemmon Survey || — || align=right | 1.1 km || 
|-id=866 bgcolor=#fefefe
| 309866 ||  || — || February 26, 2009 || Catalina || CSS || MAS || align=right data-sort-value="0.77" | 770 m || 
|-id=867 bgcolor=#fefefe
| 309867 ||  || — || February 21, 2009 || Kitt Peak || Spacewatch || FLO || align=right data-sort-value="0.88" | 880 m || 
|-id=868 bgcolor=#fefefe
| 309868 ||  || — || February 22, 2009 || Kitt Peak || Spacewatch || MAS || align=right data-sort-value="0.65" | 650 m || 
|-id=869 bgcolor=#fefefe
| 309869 ||  || — || February 24, 2009 || Mount Lemmon || Mount Lemmon Survey || — || align=right data-sort-value="0.99" | 990 m || 
|-id=870 bgcolor=#fefefe
| 309870 ||  || — || February 28, 2009 || Kitt Peak || Spacewatch || MAS || align=right data-sort-value="0.90" | 900 m || 
|-id=871 bgcolor=#E9E9E9
| 309871 ||  || — || February 28, 2009 || Kitt Peak || Spacewatch || — || align=right | 1.6 km || 
|-id=872 bgcolor=#E9E9E9
| 309872 ||  || — || February 28, 2009 || Kitt Peak || Spacewatch || AGN || align=right | 1.7 km || 
|-id=873 bgcolor=#fefefe
| 309873 ||  || — || February 25, 2009 || Catalina || CSS || NYS || align=right data-sort-value="0.75" | 750 m || 
|-id=874 bgcolor=#E9E9E9
| 309874 ||  || — || February 26, 2009 || Kitt Peak || Spacewatch || — || align=right data-sort-value="0.99" | 990 m || 
|-id=875 bgcolor=#fefefe
| 309875 ||  || — || February 26, 2009 || Kitt Peak || Spacewatch || NYS || align=right data-sort-value="0.57" | 570 m || 
|-id=876 bgcolor=#fefefe
| 309876 ||  || — || February 27, 2009 || Kitt Peak || Spacewatch || V || align=right data-sort-value="0.83" | 830 m || 
|-id=877 bgcolor=#E9E9E9
| 309877 ||  || — || February 27, 2009 || Kitt Peak || Spacewatch || — || align=right | 1.7 km || 
|-id=878 bgcolor=#fefefe
| 309878 ||  || — || February 27, 2009 || Kitt Peak || Spacewatch || — || align=right | 1.1 km || 
|-id=879 bgcolor=#E9E9E9
| 309879 ||  || — || February 27, 2009 || Kitt Peak || Spacewatch || — || align=right | 2.8 km || 
|-id=880 bgcolor=#E9E9E9
| 309880 ||  || — || February 28, 2009 || Kitt Peak || Spacewatch || — || align=right data-sort-value="0.90" | 900 m || 
|-id=881 bgcolor=#E9E9E9
| 309881 ||  || — || February 19, 2009 || Kitt Peak || Spacewatch || — || align=right | 1.3 km || 
|-id=882 bgcolor=#fefefe
| 309882 ||  || — || February 20, 2009 || Kitt Peak || Spacewatch || NYS || align=right data-sort-value="0.66" | 660 m || 
|-id=883 bgcolor=#fefefe
| 309883 ||  || — || February 21, 2009 || Kitt Peak || Spacewatch || NYS || align=right data-sort-value="0.68" | 680 m || 
|-id=884 bgcolor=#d6d6d6
| 309884 ||  || — || February 26, 2009 || Kitt Peak || Spacewatch || — || align=right | 4.3 km || 
|-id=885 bgcolor=#fefefe
| 309885 ||  || — || February 27, 2009 || Catalina || CSS || — || align=right | 1.2 km || 
|-id=886 bgcolor=#E9E9E9
| 309886 ||  || — || February 20, 2009 || Kitt Peak || Spacewatch || PAD || align=right | 1.6 km || 
|-id=887 bgcolor=#E9E9E9
| 309887 ||  || — || February 28, 2009 || Kitt Peak || Spacewatch || — || align=right | 1.0 km || 
|-id=888 bgcolor=#fefefe
| 309888 ||  || — || February 28, 2009 || Mount Lemmon || Mount Lemmon Survey || — || align=right data-sort-value="0.94" | 940 m || 
|-id=889 bgcolor=#fefefe
| 309889 ||  || — || February 20, 2009 || Kitt Peak || Spacewatch || — || align=right data-sort-value="0.89" | 890 m || 
|-id=890 bgcolor=#d6d6d6
| 309890 ||  || — || February 24, 2009 || Kitt Peak || Spacewatch || — || align=right | 4.6 km || 
|-id=891 bgcolor=#fefefe
| 309891 ||  || — || February 19, 2009 || Catalina || CSS || — || align=right | 1.1 km || 
|-id=892 bgcolor=#E9E9E9
| 309892 ||  || — || February 19, 2009 || Catalina || CSS || EUN || align=right | 2.0 km || 
|-id=893 bgcolor=#fefefe
| 309893 ||  || — || February 20, 2009 || Socorro || LINEAR || — || align=right data-sort-value="0.88" | 880 m || 
|-id=894 bgcolor=#fefefe
| 309894 ||  || — || February 22, 2009 || Kitt Peak || Spacewatch || V || align=right data-sort-value="0.88" | 880 m || 
|-id=895 bgcolor=#fefefe
| 309895 ||  || — || February 20, 2009 || Kitt Peak || Spacewatch || — || align=right data-sort-value="0.99" | 990 m || 
|-id=896 bgcolor=#E9E9E9
| 309896 ||  || — || February 26, 2009 || Mount Lemmon || Mount Lemmon Survey || — || align=right | 2.1 km || 
|-id=897 bgcolor=#fefefe
| 309897 ||  || — || March 3, 2009 || Great Shefford || P. Birtwhistle || V || align=right data-sort-value="0.86" | 860 m || 
|-id=898 bgcolor=#fefefe
| 309898 ||  || — || March 14, 2009 || La Sagra || OAM Obs. || — || align=right data-sort-value="0.91" | 910 m || 
|-id=899 bgcolor=#fefefe
| 309899 ||  || — || March 15, 2009 || La Sagra || OAM Obs. || — || align=right | 1.0 km || 
|-id=900 bgcolor=#fefefe
| 309900 ||  || — || March 15, 2009 || Kitt Peak || Spacewatch || — || align=right data-sort-value="0.88" | 880 m || 
|}

309901–310000 

|-bgcolor=#fefefe
| 309901 ||  || — || March 15, 2009 || Mount Lemmon || Mount Lemmon Survey || — || align=right data-sort-value="0.98" | 980 m || 
|-id=902 bgcolor=#E9E9E9
| 309902 ||  || — || March 15, 2009 || La Sagra || OAM Obs. || — || align=right | 2.7 km || 
|-id=903 bgcolor=#E9E9E9
| 309903 ||  || — || March 15, 2009 || La Sagra || OAM Obs. || MAR || align=right | 1.7 km || 
|-id=904 bgcolor=#E9E9E9
| 309904 ||  || — || March 2, 2009 || Mount Lemmon || Mount Lemmon Survey || — || align=right | 2.2 km || 
|-id=905 bgcolor=#fefefe
| 309905 ||  || — || March 7, 2009 || Mount Lemmon || Mount Lemmon Survey || — || align=right data-sort-value="0.97" | 970 m || 
|-id=906 bgcolor=#E9E9E9
| 309906 ||  || — || March 15, 2009 || Kitt Peak || Spacewatch || — || align=right | 1.1 km || 
|-id=907 bgcolor=#E9E9E9
| 309907 ||  || — || March 7, 2009 || Mount Lemmon || Mount Lemmon Survey || MAR || align=right | 1.5 km || 
|-id=908 bgcolor=#fefefe
| 309908 ||  || — || March 7, 2009 || Mount Lemmon || Mount Lemmon Survey || NYS || align=right data-sort-value="0.67" | 670 m || 
|-id=909 bgcolor=#fefefe
| 309909 ||  || — || March 3, 2009 || Kitt Peak || Spacewatch || — || align=right data-sort-value="0.77" | 770 m || 
|-id=910 bgcolor=#E9E9E9
| 309910 ||  || — || March 2, 2009 || Mount Lemmon || Mount Lemmon Survey || — || align=right | 3.5 km || 
|-id=911 bgcolor=#fefefe
| 309911 ||  || — || March 17, 2009 || Taunus || E. Schwab, R. Kling || ERI || align=right | 1.7 km || 
|-id=912 bgcolor=#fefefe
| 309912 ||  || — || March 16, 2009 || Kitt Peak || Spacewatch || — || align=right data-sort-value="0.87" | 870 m || 
|-id=913 bgcolor=#E9E9E9
| 309913 ||  || — || March 17, 2009 || Kitt Peak || Spacewatch || — || align=right | 1.1 km || 
|-id=914 bgcolor=#E9E9E9
| 309914 ||  || — || March 19, 2009 || Celbridge || D. McDonald || JUN || align=right | 1.4 km || 
|-id=915 bgcolor=#fefefe
| 309915 ||  || — || March 20, 2009 || Taunus || R. Kling, U. Zimmer || — || align=right data-sort-value="0.98" | 980 m || 
|-id=916 bgcolor=#fefefe
| 309916 ||  || — || March 20, 2009 || Pla D'Arguines || R. Ferrando || V || align=right data-sort-value="0.85" | 850 m || 
|-id=917 bgcolor=#E9E9E9
| 309917 Sefyani ||  ||  || March 20, 2009 || Vicques || M. Ory || MAR || align=right | 1.6 km || 
|-id=918 bgcolor=#E9E9E9
| 309918 ||  || — || March 18, 2009 || Mount Lemmon || Mount Lemmon Survey || — || align=right data-sort-value="0.78" | 780 m || 
|-id=919 bgcolor=#fefefe
| 309919 ||  || — || March 21, 2009 || Dauban || F. Kugel || — || align=right data-sort-value="0.97" | 970 m || 
|-id=920 bgcolor=#fefefe
| 309920 ||  || — || March 21, 2009 || La Sagra || OAM Obs. || MAS || align=right data-sort-value="0.79" | 790 m || 
|-id=921 bgcolor=#fefefe
| 309921 ||  || — || March 22, 2009 || La Sagra || OAM Obs. || V || align=right data-sort-value="0.96" | 960 m || 
|-id=922 bgcolor=#fefefe
| 309922 ||  || — || March 21, 2009 || Kitt Peak || Spacewatch || — || align=right data-sort-value="0.85" | 850 m || 
|-id=923 bgcolor=#E9E9E9
| 309923 ||  || — || March 24, 2009 || Mount Lemmon || Mount Lemmon Survey || — || align=right | 1.9 km || 
|-id=924 bgcolor=#fefefe
| 309924 ||  || — || March 24, 2009 || Mount Lemmon || Mount Lemmon Survey || — || align=right | 1.0 km || 
|-id=925 bgcolor=#fefefe
| 309925 ||  || — || March 21, 2009 || Catalina || CSS || — || align=right data-sort-value="0.79" | 790 m || 
|-id=926 bgcolor=#E9E9E9
| 309926 ||  || — || March 24, 2009 || Mount Lemmon || Mount Lemmon Survey || — || align=right data-sort-value="0.97" | 970 m || 
|-id=927 bgcolor=#E9E9E9
| 309927 ||  || — || March 17, 2009 || Kitt Peak || Spacewatch || AER || align=right | 1.6 km || 
|-id=928 bgcolor=#E9E9E9
| 309928 ||  || — || March 28, 2009 || Kitt Peak || Spacewatch || — || align=right | 2.5 km || 
|-id=929 bgcolor=#E9E9E9
| 309929 ||  || — || March 28, 2009 || Mount Lemmon || Mount Lemmon Survey || — || align=right | 2.2 km || 
|-id=930 bgcolor=#fefefe
| 309930 ||  || — || March 29, 2009 || Kitt Peak || Spacewatch || — || align=right data-sort-value="0.75" | 750 m || 
|-id=931 bgcolor=#E9E9E9
| 309931 ||  || — || March 29, 2009 || Kitt Peak || Spacewatch || MAR || align=right | 1.4 km || 
|-id=932 bgcolor=#fefefe
| 309932 ||  || — || March 23, 2009 || La Sagra || OAM Obs. || NYS || align=right data-sort-value="0.74" | 740 m || 
|-id=933 bgcolor=#E9E9E9
| 309933 ||  || — || March 24, 2009 || Kitt Peak || Spacewatch || MRX || align=right | 1.3 km || 
|-id=934 bgcolor=#d6d6d6
| 309934 ||  || — || March 24, 2009 || Kitt Peak || Spacewatch || EUP || align=right | 5.4 km || 
|-id=935 bgcolor=#fefefe
| 309935 ||  || — || March 18, 2009 || Kitt Peak || Spacewatch || NYS || align=right data-sort-value="0.61" | 610 m || 
|-id=936 bgcolor=#E9E9E9
| 309936 ||  || — || March 19, 2009 || Kitt Peak || Spacewatch || — || align=right | 1.7 km || 
|-id=937 bgcolor=#E9E9E9
| 309937 ||  || — || March 17, 2009 || Kitt Peak || Spacewatch || — || align=right | 1.5 km || 
|-id=938 bgcolor=#fefefe
| 309938 ||  || — || March 28, 2009 || Mount Lemmon || Mount Lemmon Survey || — || align=right | 1.4 km || 
|-id=939 bgcolor=#E9E9E9
| 309939 ||  || — || March 18, 2009 || Catalina || CSS || — || align=right | 3.1 km || 
|-id=940 bgcolor=#d6d6d6
| 309940 ||  || — || March 18, 2009 || Kitt Peak || Spacewatch || — || align=right | 2.8 km || 
|-id=941 bgcolor=#fefefe
| 309941 ||  || — || March 22, 2009 || Mount Lemmon || Mount Lemmon Survey || — || align=right data-sort-value="0.85" | 850 m || 
|-id=942 bgcolor=#E9E9E9
| 309942 ||  || — || March 24, 2009 || Kitt Peak || Spacewatch || — || align=right | 1.8 km || 
|-id=943 bgcolor=#E9E9E9
| 309943 ||  || — || March 24, 2009 || Kitt Peak || Spacewatch || — || align=right | 1.6 km || 
|-id=944 bgcolor=#E9E9E9
| 309944 ||  || — || March 24, 2009 || Kitt Peak || Spacewatch || — || align=right | 2.5 km || 
|-id=945 bgcolor=#E9E9E9
| 309945 ||  || — || March 18, 2009 || Catalina || CSS || — || align=right | 3.1 km || 
|-id=946 bgcolor=#d6d6d6
| 309946 ||  || — || March 27, 2009 || Siding Spring || SSS || — || align=right | 4.7 km || 
|-id=947 bgcolor=#d6d6d6
| 309947 ||  || — || April 3, 2009 || Cerro Burek || Alianza S4 Obs. || HYG || align=right | 3.7 km || 
|-id=948 bgcolor=#d6d6d6
| 309948 ||  || — || September 14, 2005 || Catalina || CSS || — || align=right | 4.6 km || 
|-id=949 bgcolor=#E9E9E9
| 309949 ||  || — || April 14, 2009 || Taunus || S. Karge, R. Kling || — || align=right | 1.7 km || 
|-id=950 bgcolor=#E9E9E9
| 309950 ||  || — || April 1, 2009 || Catalina || CSS || EUN || align=right | 2.1 km || 
|-id=951 bgcolor=#E9E9E9
| 309951 ||  || — || April 17, 2009 || Catalina || CSS || — || align=right | 3.0 km || 
|-id=952 bgcolor=#E9E9E9
| 309952 ||  || — || April 16, 2009 || Catalina || CSS || — || align=right | 1.2 km || 
|-id=953 bgcolor=#E9E9E9
| 309953 ||  || — || April 17, 2009 || Kitt Peak || Spacewatch || — || align=right | 2.8 km || 
|-id=954 bgcolor=#E9E9E9
| 309954 ||  || — || April 17, 2009 || Kitt Peak || Spacewatch || — || align=right | 2.0 km || 
|-id=955 bgcolor=#E9E9E9
| 309955 ||  || — || April 17, 2009 || Kitt Peak || Spacewatch || — || align=right data-sort-value="0.82" | 820 m || 
|-id=956 bgcolor=#d6d6d6
| 309956 ||  || — || April 17, 2009 || Mount Lemmon || Mount Lemmon Survey || — || align=right | 4.3 km || 
|-id=957 bgcolor=#E9E9E9
| 309957 ||  || — || April 17, 2009 || Catalina || CSS || — || align=right | 1.7 km || 
|-id=958 bgcolor=#d6d6d6
| 309958 ||  || — || April 17, 2009 || Catalina || CSS || — || align=right | 4.0 km || 
|-id=959 bgcolor=#E9E9E9
| 309959 ||  || — || April 17, 2009 || Kitt Peak || Spacewatch || WIT || align=right | 1.4 km || 
|-id=960 bgcolor=#E9E9E9
| 309960 ||  || — || April 17, 2009 || Mount Lemmon || Mount Lemmon Survey || — || align=right | 1.7 km || 
|-id=961 bgcolor=#E9E9E9
| 309961 ||  || — || April 17, 2009 || Kitt Peak || Spacewatch || — || align=right | 1.8 km || 
|-id=962 bgcolor=#E9E9E9
| 309962 ||  || — || April 19, 2009 || Kitt Peak || Spacewatch || — || align=right | 1.5 km || 
|-id=963 bgcolor=#E9E9E9
| 309963 ||  || — || April 19, 2009 || Kitt Peak || Spacewatch || WIT || align=right | 1.2 km || 
|-id=964 bgcolor=#E9E9E9
| 309964 ||  || — || April 19, 2009 || Kitt Peak || Spacewatch || — || align=right | 1.6 km || 
|-id=965 bgcolor=#E9E9E9
| 309965 ||  || — || April 20, 2009 || Kitt Peak || Spacewatch || — || align=right | 2.9 km || 
|-id=966 bgcolor=#E9E9E9
| 309966 ||  || — || April 18, 2009 || Kitt Peak || Spacewatch || ADE || align=right | 2.1 km || 
|-id=967 bgcolor=#E9E9E9
| 309967 ||  || — || April 19, 2009 || Catalina || CSS || EUN || align=right | 1.5 km || 
|-id=968 bgcolor=#d6d6d6
| 309968 ||  || — || March 18, 2009 || Kitt Peak || Spacewatch || — || align=right | 3.8 km || 
|-id=969 bgcolor=#E9E9E9
| 309969 ||  || — || April 20, 2009 || Kitt Peak || Spacewatch || — || align=right | 1.4 km || 
|-id=970 bgcolor=#E9E9E9
| 309970 ||  || — || April 21, 2009 || Socorro || LINEAR || — || align=right | 1.2 km || 
|-id=971 bgcolor=#E9E9E9
| 309971 ||  || — || April 19, 2009 || Kitt Peak || Spacewatch || — || align=right | 1.3 km || 
|-id=972 bgcolor=#d6d6d6
| 309972 ||  || — || April 19, 2009 || Kitt Peak || Spacewatch || NAE || align=right | 2.2 km || 
|-id=973 bgcolor=#E9E9E9
| 309973 ||  || — || April 20, 2009 || Kitt Peak || Spacewatch || — || align=right | 1.4 km || 
|-id=974 bgcolor=#E9E9E9
| 309974 ||  || — || April 24, 2009 || Mount Lemmon || Mount Lemmon Survey || — || align=right | 2.3 km || 
|-id=975 bgcolor=#E9E9E9
| 309975 ||  || — || April 22, 2009 || Mount Lemmon || Mount Lemmon Survey || — || align=right | 2.3 km || 
|-id=976 bgcolor=#E9E9E9
| 309976 ||  || — || April 21, 2009 || Socorro || LINEAR || — || align=right | 2.5 km || 
|-id=977 bgcolor=#E9E9E9
| 309977 ||  || — || September 17, 2006 || Catalina || CSS || — || align=right | 1.9 km || 
|-id=978 bgcolor=#E9E9E9
| 309978 ||  || — || April 22, 2009 || Mount Lemmon || Mount Lemmon Survey || — || align=right | 1.1 km || 
|-id=979 bgcolor=#E9E9E9
| 309979 ||  || — || April 24, 2009 || Kitt Peak || Spacewatch || — || align=right | 2.1 km || 
|-id=980 bgcolor=#d6d6d6
| 309980 ||  || — || April 24, 2009 || Kitt Peak || Spacewatch || — || align=right | 4.5 km || 
|-id=981 bgcolor=#E9E9E9
| 309981 ||  || — || April 26, 2009 || Catalina || CSS || — || align=right | 2.8 km || 
|-id=982 bgcolor=#d6d6d6
| 309982 ||  || — || April 19, 2009 || Catalina || CSS || EUP || align=right | 5.8 km || 
|-id=983 bgcolor=#E9E9E9
| 309983 ||  || — || April 20, 2009 || Catalina || CSS || — || align=right | 1.7 km || 
|-id=984 bgcolor=#E9E9E9
| 309984 ||  || — || April 26, 2009 || Catalina || CSS || — || align=right | 2.2 km || 
|-id=985 bgcolor=#fefefe
| 309985 ||  || — || April 27, 2009 || Mount Lemmon || Mount Lemmon Survey || — || align=right data-sort-value="0.90" | 900 m || 
|-id=986 bgcolor=#d6d6d6
| 309986 ||  || — || April 29, 2009 || Kitt Peak || Spacewatch || — || align=right | 3.1 km || 
|-id=987 bgcolor=#E9E9E9
| 309987 ||  || — || April 29, 2009 || Kitt Peak || Spacewatch || — || align=right | 2.5 km || 
|-id=988 bgcolor=#E9E9E9
| 309988 ||  || — || April 30, 2009 || Mount Lemmon || Mount Lemmon Survey || AGN || align=right | 1.3 km || 
|-id=989 bgcolor=#E9E9E9
| 309989 ||  || — || April 29, 2009 || Kitt Peak || Spacewatch || — || align=right | 1.7 km || 
|-id=990 bgcolor=#d6d6d6
| 309990 ||  || — || April 4, 2003 || Kitt Peak || Spacewatch || — || align=right | 4.5 km || 
|-id=991 bgcolor=#d6d6d6
| 309991 ||  || — || April 29, 2009 || Cerro Burek || Alianza S4 Obs. || K-2 || align=right | 1.4 km || 
|-id=992 bgcolor=#E9E9E9
| 309992 ||  || — || April 18, 2009 || Kitt Peak || Spacewatch || GEF || align=right | 1.3 km || 
|-id=993 bgcolor=#d6d6d6
| 309993 ||  || — || April 20, 2009 || Kitt Peak || Spacewatch || BRA || align=right | 1.8 km || 
|-id=994 bgcolor=#E9E9E9
| 309994 ||  || — || April 18, 2009 || Kitt Peak || Spacewatch || — || align=right | 1.2 km || 
|-id=995 bgcolor=#d6d6d6
| 309995 ||  || — || April 27, 2009 || Kitt Peak || Spacewatch || — || align=right | 2.6 km || 
|-id=996 bgcolor=#E9E9E9
| 309996 ||  || — || April 27, 2009 || Mount Lemmon || Mount Lemmon Survey || — || align=right | 2.2 km || 
|-id=997 bgcolor=#E9E9E9
| 309997 ||  || — || April 29, 2009 || Kitt Peak || Spacewatch || — || align=right | 1.7 km || 
|-id=998 bgcolor=#d6d6d6
| 309998 ||  || — || April 18, 2009 || Catalina || CSS || — || align=right | 3.2 km || 
|-id=999 bgcolor=#d6d6d6
| 309999 ||  || — || April 19, 2009 || Kitt Peak || Spacewatch || EOS || align=right | 2.4 km || 
|-id=000 bgcolor=#E9E9E9
| 310000 ||  || — || April 21, 2009 || Kitt Peak || Spacewatch || — || align=right data-sort-value="0.84" | 840 m || 
|}

References

External links 
 Discovery Circumstances: Numbered Minor Planets (305001)–(310000) (IAU Minor Planet Center)

0309